

617001–617100 

|-bgcolor=#E9E9E9
| 617001 ||  || — || August 18, 2002 || Palomar || NEAT ||  || align=right data-sort-value="0.84" | 840 m || 
|-id=002 bgcolor=#fefefe
| 617002 ||  || — || August 8, 2002 || Palomar || NEAT ||  || align=right data-sort-value="0.62" | 620 m || 
|-id=003 bgcolor=#E9E9E9
| 617003 ||  || — || August 18, 2002 || Palomar || NEAT ||  || align=right data-sort-value="0.84" | 840 m || 
|-id=004 bgcolor=#E9E9E9
| 617004 ||  || — || August 17, 2002 || Haleakala || AMOS ||  || align=right data-sort-value="0.60" | 600 m || 
|-id=005 bgcolor=#E9E9E9
| 617005 ||  || — || August 8, 2002 || Palomar || NEAT ||  || align=right data-sort-value="0.64" | 640 m || 
|-id=006 bgcolor=#fefefe
| 617006 ||  || — || August 16, 2002 || Palomar || NEAT ||  || align=right data-sort-value="0.48" | 480 m || 
|-id=007 bgcolor=#E9E9E9
| 617007 ||  || — || August 12, 2002 || Cerro Tololo || M. W. Buie, S. D. Kern ||  || align=right data-sort-value="0.89" | 890 m || 
|-id=008 bgcolor=#d6d6d6
| 617008 ||  || — || April 25, 2006 || Kitt Peak || Spacewatch ||  || align=right | 2.6 km || 
|-id=009 bgcolor=#E9E9E9
| 617009 ||  || — || July 29, 2002 || Palomar || NEAT ||  || align=right data-sort-value="0.81" | 810 m || 
|-id=010 bgcolor=#E9E9E9
| 617010 ||  || — || August 28, 2006 || Anderson Mesa || LONEOS ||  || align=right data-sort-value="0.74" | 740 m || 
|-id=011 bgcolor=#fefefe
| 617011 ||  || — || August 30, 2002 || Palomar || NEAT ||  || align=right data-sort-value="0.59" | 590 m || 
|-id=012 bgcolor=#E9E9E9
| 617012 ||  || — || September 14, 2006 || Kitt Peak || Spacewatch ||  || align=right data-sort-value="0.81" | 810 m || 
|-id=013 bgcolor=#d6d6d6
| 617013 ||  || — || October 30, 2002 || Apache Point || SDSS Collaboration ||  || align=right | 2.8 km || 
|-id=014 bgcolor=#d6d6d6
| 617014 ||  || — || September 11, 2007 || Kitt Peak || Spacewatch ||  || align=right | 2.4 km || 
|-id=015 bgcolor=#d6d6d6
| 617015 ||  || — || May 1, 2006 || Kitt Peak || D. E. Trilling ||  || align=right | 1.6 km || 
|-id=016 bgcolor=#fefefe
| 617016 ||  || — || October 28, 2010 || Mount Lemmon || Mount Lemmon Survey ||  || align=right data-sort-value="0.56" | 560 m || 
|-id=017 bgcolor=#E9E9E9
| 617017 ||  || — || December 2, 2011 || Charleston || R. Holmes ||  || align=right data-sort-value="0.81" | 810 m || 
|-id=018 bgcolor=#fefefe
| 617018 ||  || — || November 10, 2009 || Kitt Peak || Spacewatch ||  || align=right data-sort-value="0.55" | 550 m || 
|-id=019 bgcolor=#E9E9E9
| 617019 ||  || — || June 22, 2010 || Mount Lemmon || Mount Lemmon Survey ||  || align=right data-sort-value="0.85" | 850 m || 
|-id=020 bgcolor=#fefefe
| 617020 ||  || — || October 23, 2009 || Kitt Peak || Spacewatch ||  || align=right data-sort-value="0.65" | 650 m || 
|-id=021 bgcolor=#d6d6d6
| 617021 ||  || — || February 17, 2010 || Kitt Peak || Spacewatch ||  || align=right | 3.1 km || 
|-id=022 bgcolor=#fefefe
| 617022 ||  || — || November 19, 2009 || Mount Lemmon || Mount Lemmon Survey ||  || align=right data-sort-value="0.57" | 570 m || 
|-id=023 bgcolor=#d6d6d6
| 617023 ||  || — || April 3, 2016 || Haleakala || Pan-STARRS ||  || align=right | 1.9 km || 
|-id=024 bgcolor=#E9E9E9
| 617024 ||  || — || September 5, 2002 || Socorro || LINEAR ||  || align=right data-sort-value="0.94" | 940 m || 
|-id=025 bgcolor=#E9E9E9
| 617025 ||  || — || September 12, 2002 || Palomar || NEAT ||  || align=right | 1.0 km || 
|-id=026 bgcolor=#E9E9E9
| 617026 ||  || — || September 12, 2002 || Palomar || NEAT ||  || align=right data-sort-value="0.82" | 820 m || 
|-id=027 bgcolor=#E9E9E9
| 617027 ||  || — || September 13, 2002 || Palomar || NEAT ||  || align=right data-sort-value="0.96" | 960 m || 
|-id=028 bgcolor=#d6d6d6
| 617028 ||  || — || March 11, 2005 || Mount Lemmon || Mount Lemmon Survey ||  || align=right | 2.0 km || 
|-id=029 bgcolor=#fefefe
| 617029 ||  || — || November 23, 2006 || Kitt Peak || Spacewatch ||  || align=right data-sort-value="0.62" | 620 m || 
|-id=030 bgcolor=#fefefe
| 617030 ||  || — || September 12, 2002 || Palomar || NEAT ||  || align=right data-sort-value="0.65" | 650 m || 
|-id=031 bgcolor=#d6d6d6
| 617031 ||  || — || September 10, 2007 || Mount Lemmon || Mount Lemmon Survey ||  || align=right | 2.5 km || 
|-id=032 bgcolor=#d6d6d6
| 617032 ||  || — || November 8, 2008 || Mount Lemmon || Mount Lemmon Survey ||  || align=right | 2.4 km || 
|-id=033 bgcolor=#E9E9E9
| 617033 ||  || — || August 17, 2006 || Palomar || NEAT ||  || align=right | 1.2 km || 
|-id=034 bgcolor=#d6d6d6
| 617034 ||  || — || September 3, 2002 || Campo Imperatore || CINEOS ||  || align=right | 2.3 km || 
|-id=035 bgcolor=#fefefe
| 617035 ||  || — || September 27, 2002 || Palomar || NEAT ||  || align=right data-sort-value="0.61" | 610 m || 
|-id=036 bgcolor=#d6d6d6
| 617036 ||  || — || September 12, 2007 || Kitt Peak || Spacewatch ||  || align=right | 2.4 km || 
|-id=037 bgcolor=#d6d6d6
| 617037 ||  || — || October 3, 2002 || Campo Imperatore || CINEOS ||  || align=right | 2.0 km || 
|-id=038 bgcolor=#E9E9E9
| 617038 ||  || — || October 2, 2002 || Socorro || LINEAR ||  || align=right | 1.5 km || 
|-id=039 bgcolor=#d6d6d6
| 617039 ||  || — || October 3, 2002 || Palomar || NEAT ||  || align=right | 3.2 km || 
|-id=040 bgcolor=#d6d6d6
| 617040 ||  || — || October 5, 2002 || Palomar || NEAT ||  || align=right | 2.8 km || 
|-id=041 bgcolor=#fefefe
| 617041 ||  || — || October 4, 2002 || Palomar || NEAT ||  || align=right data-sort-value="0.67" | 670 m || 
|-id=042 bgcolor=#d6d6d6
| 617042 ||  || — || October 5, 2002 || Palomar || NEAT ||  || align=right | 2.4 km || 
|-id=043 bgcolor=#E9E9E9
| 617043 ||  || — || October 5, 2002 || Palomar || NEAT ||  || align=right | 1.3 km || 
|-id=044 bgcolor=#E9E9E9
| 617044 ||  || — || October 5, 2002 || Kitt Peak || Spacewatch ||  || align=right data-sort-value="0.73" | 730 m || 
|-id=045 bgcolor=#d6d6d6
| 617045 ||  || — || October 5, 2002 || Palomar || NEAT ||  || align=right | 2.5 km || 
|-id=046 bgcolor=#E9E9E9
| 617046 ||  || — || October 4, 2002 || Socorro || LINEAR ||  || align=right | 1.3 km || 
|-id=047 bgcolor=#E9E9E9
| 617047 ||  || — || September 30, 2006 || Mount Lemmon || Mount Lemmon Survey ||  || align=right | 1.2 km || 
|-id=048 bgcolor=#fefefe
| 617048 ||  || — || September 14, 2002 || Palomar || NEAT ||  || align=right data-sort-value="0.58" | 580 m || 
|-id=049 bgcolor=#fefefe
| 617049 ||  || — || March 19, 2009 || Mount Lemmon || Mount Lemmon Survey || H || align=right data-sort-value="0.67" | 670 m || 
|-id=050 bgcolor=#E9E9E9
| 617050 ||  || — || January 2, 2012 || Kitt Peak || Spacewatch ||  || align=right | 1.5 km || 
|-id=051 bgcolor=#d6d6d6
| 617051 ||  || — || January 6, 2010 || Kitt Peak || Spacewatch ||  || align=right | 3.4 km || 
|-id=052 bgcolor=#fefefe
| 617052 ||  || — || September 18, 2009 || Mount Lemmon || Mount Lemmon Survey ||  || align=right data-sort-value="0.69" | 690 m || 
|-id=053 bgcolor=#fefefe
| 617053 ||  || — || October 23, 2009 || Mount Lemmon || Mount Lemmon Survey ||  || align=right data-sort-value="0.50" | 500 m || 
|-id=054 bgcolor=#E9E9E9
| 617054 ||  || — || September 6, 2002 || Campo Imperatore || CINEOS ||  || align=right | 1.2 km || 
|-id=055 bgcolor=#E9E9E9
| 617055 ||  || — || October 15, 2002 || Palomar || NEAT ||  || align=right | 1.3 km || 
|-id=056 bgcolor=#E9E9E9
| 617056 ||  || — || October 30, 2002 || Kitt Peak || Spacewatch ||  || align=right data-sort-value="0.93" | 930 m || 
|-id=057 bgcolor=#E9E9E9
| 617057 ||  || — || September 17, 2006 || Catalina || CSS ||  || align=right data-sort-value="0.73" | 730 m || 
|-id=058 bgcolor=#fefefe
| 617058 ||  || — || December 27, 2006 || Mount Lemmon || Mount Lemmon Survey ||  || align=right data-sort-value="0.80" | 800 m || 
|-id=059 bgcolor=#E9E9E9
| 617059 ||  || — || September 2, 2010 || Mount Lemmon || Mount Lemmon Survey ||  || align=right data-sort-value="0.94" | 940 m || 
|-id=060 bgcolor=#E9E9E9
| 617060 ||  || — || August 29, 2006 || Kitt Peak || Spacewatch ||  || align=right | 1.0 km || 
|-id=061 bgcolor=#fefefe
| 617061 ||  || — || November 2, 2002 || Haleakala || AMOS ||  || align=right data-sort-value="0.54" | 540 m || 
|-id=062 bgcolor=#d6d6d6
| 617062 ||  || — || November 14, 2002 || Palomar || NEAT ||  || align=right | 2.8 km || 
|-id=063 bgcolor=#E9E9E9
| 617063 ||  || — || September 17, 2006 || Kitt Peak || Spacewatch ||  || align=right | 1.1 km || 
|-id=064 bgcolor=#fefefe
| 617064 ||  || — || March 27, 2004 || Anderson Mesa || LONEOS ||  || align=right data-sort-value="0.77" | 770 m || 
|-id=065 bgcolor=#E9E9E9
| 617065 ||  || — || January 2, 2012 || Mount Lemmon || Mount Lemmon Survey ||  || align=right | 1.4 km || 
|-id=066 bgcolor=#C2FFFF
| 617066 ||  || — || April 6, 2008 || Kitt Peak || Spacewatch || L5 || align=right | 8.0 km || 
|-id=067 bgcolor=#E9E9E9
| 617067 ||  || — || February 13, 2008 || Mount Lemmon || Mount Lemmon Survey ||  || align=right | 1.3 km || 
|-id=068 bgcolor=#E9E9E9
| 617068 ||  || — || November 16, 2002 || Palomar || NEAT ||  || align=right | 1.5 km || 
|-id=069 bgcolor=#d6d6d6
| 617069 ||  || — || December 1, 2008 || Mount Lemmon || Mount Lemmon Survey ||  || align=right | 2.6 km || 
|-id=070 bgcolor=#E9E9E9
| 617070 ||  || — || December 28, 2011 || Mount Lemmon || Mount Lemmon Survey ||  || align=right | 1.4 km || 
|-id=071 bgcolor=#d6d6d6
| 617071 ||  || — || July 19, 2007 || Siding Spring || SSS || Tj (2.96) || align=right | 3.1 km || 
|-id=072 bgcolor=#fefefe
| 617072 ||  || — || December 9, 2015 || Haleakala || Pan-STARRS || H || align=right data-sort-value="0.69" | 690 m || 
|-id=073 bgcolor=#fefefe
| 617073 ||  || — || December 6, 2002 || Socorro || LINEAR || H || align=right data-sort-value="0.89" | 890 m || 
|-id=074 bgcolor=#d6d6d6
| 617074 ||  || — || December 10, 2002 || Palomar || NEAT ||  || align=right | 3.0 km || 
|-id=075 bgcolor=#E9E9E9
| 617075 ||  || — || November 24, 2002 || Palomar || NEAT ||  || align=right | 1.3 km || 
|-id=076 bgcolor=#E9E9E9
| 617076 ||  || — || November 23, 2006 || Mount Lemmon || Mount Lemmon Survey ||  || align=right data-sort-value="0.67" | 670 m || 
|-id=077 bgcolor=#fefefe
| 617077 ||  || — || March 13, 2011 || Mount Lemmon || Mount Lemmon Survey ||  || align=right data-sort-value="0.77" | 770 m || 
|-id=078 bgcolor=#d6d6d6
| 617078 ||  || — || October 17, 2012 || Mount Lemmon || Mount Lemmon Survey ||  || align=right | 2.4 km || 
|-id=079 bgcolor=#E9E9E9
| 617079 ||  || — || December 29, 2011 || Mount Lemmon || Mount Lemmon Survey ||  || align=right | 1.1 km || 
|-id=080 bgcolor=#d6d6d6
| 617080 ||  || — || January 19, 2004 || Kitt Peak || Spacewatch ||  || align=right | 2.9 km || 
|-id=081 bgcolor=#d6d6d6
| 617081 ||  || — || January 5, 2003 || Socorro || LINEAR ||  || align=right | 3.7 km || 
|-id=082 bgcolor=#E9E9E9
| 617082 ||  || — || January 28, 2003 || Haleakala || AMOS ||  || align=right | 1.6 km || 
|-id=083 bgcolor=#E9E9E9
| 617083 ||  || — || January 29, 2003 || Palomar || NEAT ||  || align=right | 2.1 km || 
|-id=084 bgcolor=#E9E9E9
| 617084 ||  || — || January 28, 2003 || Palomar || NEAT ||  || align=right | 1.7 km || 
|-id=085 bgcolor=#E9E9E9
| 617085 ||  || — || January 26, 2003 || Anderson Mesa || LONEOS ||  || align=right | 2.0 km || 
|-id=086 bgcolor=#E9E9E9
| 617086 ||  || — || July 19, 2005 || Palomar || NEAT ||  || align=right | 2.0 km || 
|-id=087 bgcolor=#d6d6d6
| 617087 ||  || — || January 30, 2014 || Kitt Peak || Spacewatch ||  || align=right | 2.8 km || 
|-id=088 bgcolor=#d6d6d6
| 617088 ||  || — || April 20, 2004 || Kitt Peak || Spacewatch ||  || align=right | 2.4 km || 
|-id=089 bgcolor=#d6d6d6
| 617089 ||  || — || September 15, 2006 || Kitt Peak || Spacewatch ||  || align=right | 2.2 km || 
|-id=090 bgcolor=#fefefe
| 617090 ||  || — || July 25, 2015 || Haleakala || Pan-STARRS ||  || align=right data-sort-value="0.72" | 720 m || 
|-id=091 bgcolor=#fefefe
| 617091 ||  || — || March 20, 2007 || Mount Lemmon || Mount Lemmon Survey ||  || align=right data-sort-value="0.64" | 640 m || 
|-id=092 bgcolor=#E9E9E9
| 617092 ||  || — || January 26, 2012 || Mount Lemmon || Mount Lemmon Survey ||  || align=right | 1.5 km || 
|-id=093 bgcolor=#E9E9E9
| 617093 ||  || — || December 4, 2015 || Mount Lemmon || Mount Lemmon Survey ||  || align=right | 1.5 km || 
|-id=094 bgcolor=#fefefe
| 617094 ||  || — || November 10, 2016 || Mount Lemmon || Mount Lemmon Survey ||  || align=right data-sort-value="0.63" | 630 m || 
|-id=095 bgcolor=#E9E9E9
| 617095 ||  || — || November 13, 2010 || Mount Lemmon || Mount Lemmon Survey ||  || align=right | 1.5 km || 
|-id=096 bgcolor=#E9E9E9
| 617096 ||  || — || February 7, 2003 || Palomar || NEAT ||  || align=right | 2.5 km || 
|-id=097 bgcolor=#fefefe
| 617097 ||  || — || March 10, 2003 || Kitt Peak || Spacewatch ||  || align=right data-sort-value="0.38" | 380 m || 
|-id=098 bgcolor=#E9E9E9
| 617098 ||  || — || March 7, 2003 || Anderson Mesa || LONEOS ||  || align=right | 1.8 km || 
|-id=099 bgcolor=#fefefe
| 617099 ||  || — || March 12, 2003 || Kitt Peak || Spacewatch ||  || align=right data-sort-value="0.69" | 690 m || 
|-id=100 bgcolor=#fefefe
| 617100 ||  || — || March 23, 2003 || Palomar || NEAT || H || align=right data-sort-value="0.72" | 720 m || 
|}

617101–617200 

|-bgcolor=#E9E9E9
| 617101 ||  || — || March 24, 2003 || Kitt Peak || Spacewatch ||  || align=right | 1.8 km || 
|-id=102 bgcolor=#E9E9E9
| 617102 ||  || — || March 25, 2003 || Palomar || NEAT ||  || align=right | 3.1 km || 
|-id=103 bgcolor=#C2E0FF
| 617103 ||  || — || March 31, 2003 || Cerro Tololo || Cerro Tololo Obs. || SDO || align=right | 229 km || 
|-id=104 bgcolor=#fefefe
| 617104 ||  || — || March 26, 2003 || Kitt Peak || Spacewatch ||  || align=right data-sort-value="0.69" | 690 m || 
|-id=105 bgcolor=#fefefe
| 617105 ||  || — || April 3, 2003 || Anderson Mesa || LONEOS ||  || align=right data-sort-value="0.74" | 740 m || 
|-id=106 bgcolor=#fefefe
| 617106 ||  || — || April 4, 2003 || Kitt Peak || Spacewatch ||  || align=right data-sort-value="0.68" | 680 m || 
|-id=107 bgcolor=#fefefe
| 617107 ||  || — || April 5, 2003 || Kitt Peak || Spacewatch ||  || align=right data-sort-value="0.72" | 720 m || 
|-id=108 bgcolor=#fefefe
| 617108 ||  || — || April 5, 2003 || Kitt Peak || Spacewatch ||  || align=right data-sort-value="0.64" | 640 m || 
|-id=109 bgcolor=#fefefe
| 617109 ||  || — || September 11, 2004 || Kitt Peak || Spacewatch ||  || align=right data-sort-value="0.73" | 730 m || 
|-id=110 bgcolor=#d6d6d6
| 617110 ||  || — || January 18, 2008 || Kitt Peak || Spacewatch ||  || align=right | 2.7 km || 
|-id=111 bgcolor=#E9E9E9
| 617111 ||  || — || February 16, 2012 || Haleakala || Pan-STARRS ||  || align=right | 2.0 km || 
|-id=112 bgcolor=#fefefe
| 617112 ||  || — || January 6, 2010 || Kitt Peak || Spacewatch ||  || align=right data-sort-value="0.67" | 670 m || 
|-id=113 bgcolor=#E9E9E9
| 617113 ||  || — || April 1, 2003 || Apache Point || SDSS Collaboration ||  || align=right | 2.3 km || 
|-id=114 bgcolor=#fefefe
| 617114 ||  || — || April 24, 2003 || Kitt Peak || Spacewatch ||  || align=right data-sort-value="0.69" | 690 m || 
|-id=115 bgcolor=#fefefe
| 617115 ||  || — || March 27, 2003 || Palomar || NEAT ||  || align=right data-sort-value="0.60" | 600 m || 
|-id=116 bgcolor=#fefefe
| 617116 ||  || — || April 28, 2003 || Kitt Peak || Spacewatch ||  || align=right data-sort-value="0.67" | 670 m || 
|-id=117 bgcolor=#fefefe
| 617117 ||  || — || April 4, 2003 || Kitt Peak || Spacewatch ||  || align=right data-sort-value="0.67" | 670 m || 
|-id=118 bgcolor=#E9E9E9
| 617118 ||  || — || February 25, 2012 || Mayhill-ISON || L. Elenin ||  || align=right | 1.9 km || 
|-id=119 bgcolor=#E9E9E9
| 617119 ||  || — || September 5, 2010 || Mount Lemmon || Mount Lemmon Survey ||  || align=right | 1.9 km || 
|-id=120 bgcolor=#fefefe
| 617120 ||  || — || June 2, 2003 || Kitt Peak || Spacewatch ||  || align=right | 1.0 km || 
|-id=121 bgcolor=#E9E9E9
| 617121 ||  || — || December 3, 2010 || Mount Lemmon || Mount Lemmon Survey ||  || align=right | 1.7 km || 
|-id=122 bgcolor=#fefefe
| 617122 ||  || — || December 28, 2005 || Kitt Peak || Spacewatch ||  || align=right data-sort-value="0.87" | 870 m || 
|-id=123 bgcolor=#fefefe
| 617123 ||  || — || May 1, 2003 || Kitt Peak || Spacewatch ||  || align=right data-sort-value="0.69" | 690 m || 
|-id=124 bgcolor=#fefefe
| 617124 ||  || — || February 28, 2014 || Haleakala || Pan-STARRS ||  || align=right data-sort-value="0.55" | 550 m || 
|-id=125 bgcolor=#fefefe
| 617125 ||  || — || May 11, 2003 || Kitt Peak || Spacewatch ||  || align=right data-sort-value="0.68" | 680 m || 
|-id=126 bgcolor=#E9E9E9
| 617126 ||  || — || May 22, 2003 || Kitt Peak || Spacewatch ||  || align=right | 1.4 km || 
|-id=127 bgcolor=#E9E9E9
| 617127 ||  || — || May 23, 2003 || Kitt Peak || Spacewatch ||  || align=right | 1.7 km || 
|-id=128 bgcolor=#fefefe
| 617128 ||  || — || March 31, 2003 || Kitt Peak || Spacewatch ||  || align=right data-sort-value="0.76" | 760 m || 
|-id=129 bgcolor=#E9E9E9
| 617129 ||  || — || May 26, 2003 || Kitt Peak || Spacewatch ||  || align=right | 1.8 km || 
|-id=130 bgcolor=#fefefe
| 617130 ||  || — || September 25, 2011 || Haleakala || Pan-STARRS ||  || align=right data-sort-value="0.62" | 620 m || 
|-id=131 bgcolor=#fefefe
| 617131 ||  || — || September 12, 2015 || Haleakala || Pan-STARRS ||  || align=right data-sort-value="0.68" | 680 m || 
|-id=132 bgcolor=#fefefe
| 617132 ||  || — || April 15, 2012 || Haleakala || Pan-STARRS ||  || align=right data-sort-value="0.46" | 460 m || 
|-id=133 bgcolor=#FA8072
| 617133 ||  || — || July 8, 2003 || Palomar || NEAT ||  || align=right data-sort-value="0.55" | 550 m || 
|-id=134 bgcolor=#E9E9E9
| 617134 ||  || — || September 14, 2013 || Haleakala || Pan-STARRS ||  || align=right | 2.2 km || 
|-id=135 bgcolor=#fefefe
| 617135 ||  || — || August 22, 2003 || Palomar || NEAT ||  || align=right data-sort-value="0.39" | 390 m || 
|-id=136 bgcolor=#E9E9E9
| 617136 ||  || — || December 22, 2008 || Mount Lemmon || Mount Lemmon Survey ||  || align=right data-sort-value="0.75" | 750 m || 
|-id=137 bgcolor=#fefefe
| 617137 ||  || — || September 19, 2003 || Kitt Peak || Spacewatch ||  || align=right data-sort-value="0.73" | 730 m || 
|-id=138 bgcolor=#fefefe
| 617138 ||  || — || September 27, 2003 || Kitt Peak || Spacewatch ||  || align=right data-sort-value="0.56" | 560 m || 
|-id=139 bgcolor=#fefefe
| 617139 ||  || — || September 18, 2003 || Kitt Peak || Spacewatch ||  || align=right data-sort-value="0.53" | 530 m || 
|-id=140 bgcolor=#fefefe
| 617140 ||  || — || September 17, 2003 || Palomar || NEAT ||  || align=right data-sort-value="0.53" | 530 m || 
|-id=141 bgcolor=#fefefe
| 617141 ||  || — || September 19, 2003 || Anderson Mesa || LONEOS ||  || align=right data-sort-value="0.68" | 680 m || 
|-id=142 bgcolor=#fefefe
| 617142 ||  || — || October 2, 2003 || Kitt Peak || Spacewatch ||  || align=right data-sort-value="0.66" | 660 m || 
|-id=143 bgcolor=#fefefe
| 617143 ||  || — || September 20, 2003 || Kitt Peak || Spacewatch ||  || align=right data-sort-value="0.89" | 890 m || 
|-id=144 bgcolor=#d6d6d6
| 617144 ||  || — || September 29, 2003 || Kitt Peak || Spacewatch ||  || align=right | 1.7 km || 
|-id=145 bgcolor=#d6d6d6
| 617145 ||  || — || September 26, 2003 || Apache Point || SDSS Collaboration ||  || align=right | 1.9 km || 
|-id=146 bgcolor=#fefefe
| 617146 ||  || — || October 16, 2003 || Palomar || NEAT ||  || align=right data-sort-value="0.43" | 430 m || 
|-id=147 bgcolor=#d6d6d6
| 617147 ||  || — || September 26, 2003 || Apache Point || SDSS Collaboration ||  || align=right | 2.1 km || 
|-id=148 bgcolor=#d6d6d6
| 617148 ||  || — || September 26, 2003 || Apache Point || SDSS Collaboration ||  || align=right | 1.9 km || 
|-id=149 bgcolor=#d6d6d6
| 617149 ||  || — || September 27, 2003 || Apache Point || SDSS Collaboration ||  || align=right | 2.1 km || 
|-id=150 bgcolor=#fefefe
| 617150 ||  || — || September 25, 2003 || Palomar || NEAT ||  || align=right data-sort-value="0.60" | 600 m || 
|-id=151 bgcolor=#E9E9E9
| 617151 ||  || — || September 27, 2003 || Anderson Mesa || LONEOS ||  || align=right | 1.1 km || 
|-id=152 bgcolor=#fefefe
| 617152 ||  || — || September 30, 2003 || Kitt Peak || Spacewatch ||  || align=right data-sort-value="0.74" | 740 m || 
|-id=153 bgcolor=#E9E9E9
| 617153 ||  || — || September 18, 2003 || Kitt Peak || Spacewatch ||  || align=right data-sort-value="0.71" | 710 m || 
|-id=154 bgcolor=#fefefe
| 617154 ||  || — || September 18, 2003 || Kitt Peak || Spacewatch ||  || align=right data-sort-value="0.58" | 580 m || 
|-id=155 bgcolor=#d6d6d6
| 617155 ||  || — || September 18, 2003 || Kitt Peak || Spacewatch ||  || align=right | 2.4 km || 
|-id=156 bgcolor=#fefefe
| 617156 ||  || — || October 5, 2013 || Haleakala || Pan-STARRS ||  || align=right data-sort-value="0.58" | 580 m || 
|-id=157 bgcolor=#fefefe
| 617157 ||  || — || October 30, 2013 || Haleakala || Pan-STARRS ||  || align=right data-sort-value="0.55" | 550 m || 
|-id=158 bgcolor=#fefefe
| 617158 ||  || — || November 23, 2016 || Mount Lemmon || Mount Lemmon Survey ||  || align=right data-sort-value="0.56" | 560 m || 
|-id=159 bgcolor=#E9E9E9
| 617159 ||  || — || October 1, 2015 || Mount Lemmon || Mount Lemmon Survey ||  || align=right data-sort-value="0.62" | 620 m || 
|-id=160 bgcolor=#fefefe
| 617160 ||  || — || September 16, 2003 || Kitt Peak || Spacewatch ||  || align=right data-sort-value="0.40" | 400 m || 
|-id=161 bgcolor=#d6d6d6
| 617161 ||  || — || September 27, 2003 || Kitt Peak || Spacewatch ||  || align=right | 1.9 km || 
|-id=162 bgcolor=#d6d6d6
| 617162 ||  || — || September 4, 2008 || Kitt Peak || Spacewatch ||  || align=right | 2.3 km || 
|-id=163 bgcolor=#d6d6d6
| 617163 ||  || — || September 26, 2003 || Apache Point || SDSS Collaboration ||  || align=right | 1.8 km || 
|-id=164 bgcolor=#d6d6d6
| 617164 ||  || — || September 25, 1998 || Kitt Peak || Spacewatch ||  || align=right | 1.7 km || 
|-id=165 bgcolor=#d6d6d6
| 617165 ||  || — || September 16, 2003 || Kitt Peak || Spacewatch ||  || align=right | 1.8 km || 
|-id=166 bgcolor=#d6d6d6
| 617166 ||  || — || September 21, 2003 || Kitt Peak || Spacewatch ||  || align=right | 2.1 km || 
|-id=167 bgcolor=#fefefe
| 617167 ||  || — || January 17, 2005 || Kitt Peak || Spacewatch ||  || align=right data-sort-value="0.69" | 690 m || 
|-id=168 bgcolor=#fefefe
| 617168 ||  || — || October 14, 2010 || Mount Lemmon || Mount Lemmon Survey ||  || align=right data-sort-value="0.59" | 590 m || 
|-id=169 bgcolor=#E9E9E9
| 617169 ||  || — || January 31, 2017 || Haleakala || Pan-STARRS ||  || align=right data-sort-value="0.76" | 760 m || 
|-id=170 bgcolor=#d6d6d6
| 617170 ||  || — || September 3, 2013 || Haleakala || Pan-STARRS ||  || align=right | 2.3 km || 
|-id=171 bgcolor=#fefefe
| 617171 ||  || — || October 3, 2003 || Kitt Peak || Spacewatch ||  || align=right data-sort-value="0.82" | 820 m || 
|-id=172 bgcolor=#fefefe
| 617172 ||  || — || October 24, 2003 || Kitt Peak || Spacewatch ||  || align=right data-sort-value="0.65" | 650 m || 
|-id=173 bgcolor=#fefefe
| 617173 ||  || — || October 21, 2003 || Palomar || NEAT ||  || align=right data-sort-value="0.73" | 730 m || 
|-id=174 bgcolor=#fefefe
| 617174 ||  || — || October 16, 2003 || Kitt Peak || Spacewatch ||  || align=right data-sort-value="0.86" | 860 m || 
|-id=175 bgcolor=#fefefe
| 617175 ||  || — || October 20, 2003 || Kitt Peak || Spacewatch ||  || align=right data-sort-value="0.82" | 820 m || 
|-id=176 bgcolor=#E9E9E9
| 617176 ||  || — || October 21, 2003 || Kitt Peak || Spacewatch ||  || align=right data-sort-value="0.91" | 910 m || 
|-id=177 bgcolor=#E9E9E9
| 617177 ||  || — || October 22, 2003 || Apache Point || SDSS Collaboration ||  || align=right data-sort-value="0.74" | 740 m || 
|-id=178 bgcolor=#E9E9E9
| 617178 ||  || — || March 11, 2005 || Mount Lemmon || Mount Lemmon Survey ||  || align=right data-sort-value="0.71" | 710 m || 
|-id=179 bgcolor=#d6d6d6
| 617179 ||  || — || October 23, 2003 || Apache Point || SDSS Collaboration ||  || align=right | 2.1 km || 
|-id=180 bgcolor=#d6d6d6
| 617180 ||  || — || April 26, 2006 || Kitt Peak || Spacewatch ||  || align=right | 2.4 km || 
|-id=181 bgcolor=#fefefe
| 617181 ||  || — || October 18, 2003 || Palomar || NEAT || H || align=right data-sort-value="0.56" | 560 m || 
|-id=182 bgcolor=#d6d6d6
| 617182 ||  || — || September 26, 2008 || Kitt Peak || Spacewatch ||  || align=right | 2.4 km || 
|-id=183 bgcolor=#d6d6d6
| 617183 ||  || — || October 26, 2008 || Kitt Peak || Spacewatch ||  || align=right | 3.0 km || 
|-id=184 bgcolor=#fefefe
| 617184 ||  || — || January 9, 2013 || Kitt Peak || Spacewatch ||  || align=right data-sort-value="0.80" | 800 m || 
|-id=185 bgcolor=#fefefe
| 617185 ||  || — || September 10, 2013 || Haleakala || Pan-STARRS ||  || align=right data-sort-value="0.64" | 640 m || 
|-id=186 bgcolor=#d6d6d6
| 617186 ||  || — || January 22, 2015 || Haleakala || Pan-STARRS ||  || align=right | 2.0 km || 
|-id=187 bgcolor=#fefefe
| 617187 ||  || — || October 29, 2003 || Kitt Peak || Spacewatch ||  || align=right data-sort-value="0.55" | 550 m || 
|-id=188 bgcolor=#fefefe
| 617188 ||  || — || August 20, 2006 || Palomar || NEAT ||  || align=right data-sort-value="0.55" | 550 m || 
|-id=189 bgcolor=#fefefe
| 617189 ||  || — || May 20, 2012 || Mount Lemmon || Mount Lemmon Survey ||  || align=right data-sort-value="0.48" | 480 m || 
|-id=190 bgcolor=#fefefe
| 617190 ||  || — || November 15, 2003 || Kitt Peak || Spacewatch ||  || align=right data-sort-value="0.87" | 870 m || 
|-id=191 bgcolor=#E9E9E9
| 617191 ||  || — || November 4, 2003 || Ondrejov || P. Kušnirák ||  || align=right | 1.6 km || 
|-id=192 bgcolor=#E9E9E9
| 617192 ||  || — || October 27, 2003 || Kitt Peak || Spacewatch ||  || align=right data-sort-value="0.75" | 750 m || 
|-id=193 bgcolor=#FA8072
| 617193 ||  || — || October 16, 2003 || Kitt Peak || Spacewatch ||  || align=right data-sort-value="0.54" | 540 m || 
|-id=194 bgcolor=#fefefe
| 617194 ||  || — || November 14, 2003 || Palomar || NEAT ||  || align=right data-sort-value="0.73" | 730 m || 
|-id=195 bgcolor=#d6d6d6
| 617195 ||  || — || November 19, 2003 || Kitt Peak || Spacewatch ||  || align=right | 2.7 km || 
|-id=196 bgcolor=#FA8072
| 617196 ||  || — || November 24, 2003 || Nogales || P. R. Holvorcem, M. Schwartz || H || align=right data-sort-value="0.74" | 740 m || 
|-id=197 bgcolor=#fefefe
| 617197 ||  || — || November 20, 2003 || Socorro || LINEAR ||  || align=right data-sort-value="0.70" | 700 m || 
|-id=198 bgcolor=#E9E9E9
| 617198 ||  || — || November 26, 2003 || Kitt Peak || Spacewatch ||  || align=right data-sort-value="0.94" | 940 m || 
|-id=199 bgcolor=#d6d6d6
| 617199 ||  || — || November 19, 2003 || Kitt Peak || Spacewatch ||  || align=right | 2.5 km || 
|-id=200 bgcolor=#E9E9E9
| 617200 ||  || — || November 19, 2003 || Catalina || CSS ||  || align=right | 1.2 km || 
|}

617201–617300 

|-bgcolor=#C2FFFF
| 617201 ||  || — || April 24, 2009 || Mount Lemmon || Mount Lemmon Survey || L5 || align=right | 12 km || 
|-id=202 bgcolor=#fefefe
| 617202 ||  || — || October 20, 2017 || Mount Lemmon || Mount Lemmon Survey || H || align=right data-sort-value="0.48" | 480 m || 
|-id=203 bgcolor=#fefefe
| 617203 ||  || — || December 13, 2010 || Mauna Kea || L. Wells, M. Micheli ||  || align=right data-sort-value="0.56" | 560 m || 
|-id=204 bgcolor=#E9E9E9
| 617204 ||  || — || August 26, 2011 || Kitt Peak || Spacewatch ||  || align=right data-sort-value="0.83" | 830 m || 
|-id=205 bgcolor=#fefefe
| 617205 ||  || — || March 21, 2015 || Haleakala || Pan-STARRS ||  || align=right data-sort-value="0.49" | 490 m || 
|-id=206 bgcolor=#E9E9E9
| 617206 ||  || — || March 2, 2009 || Kitt Peak || Spacewatch ||  || align=right | 1.1 km || 
|-id=207 bgcolor=#E9E9E9
| 617207 ||  || — || October 5, 2015 || Haleakala || Pan-STARRS ||  || align=right data-sort-value="0.88" | 880 m || 
|-id=208 bgcolor=#E9E9E9
| 617208 ||  || — || November 3, 2011 || Mount Lemmon || Mount Lemmon Survey ||  || align=right data-sort-value="0.89" | 890 m || 
|-id=209 bgcolor=#fefefe
| 617209 ||  || — || July 2, 2014 || Haleakala || Pan-STARRS ||  || align=right data-sort-value="0.96" | 960 m || 
|-id=210 bgcolor=#d6d6d6
| 617210 ||  || — || December 11, 2014 || Mount Lemmon || Mount Lemmon Survey ||  || align=right | 2.3 km || 
|-id=211 bgcolor=#d6d6d6
| 617211 ||  || — || September 2, 2008 || Kitt Peak || Spacewatch ||  || align=right | 2.1 km || 
|-id=212 bgcolor=#E9E9E9
| 617212 ||  || — || November 17, 2011 || Kitt Peak || Spacewatch ||  || align=right data-sort-value="0.75" | 750 m || 
|-id=213 bgcolor=#E9E9E9
| 617213 ||  || — || November 24, 2011 || Mount Lemmon || Mount Lemmon Survey ||  || align=right data-sort-value="0.81" | 810 m || 
|-id=214 bgcolor=#d6d6d6
| 617214 ||  || — || October 9, 2008 || Mount Lemmon || Mount Lemmon Survey ||  || align=right | 2.2 km || 
|-id=215 bgcolor=#d6d6d6
| 617215 ||  || — || September 14, 2013 || Haleakala || Pan-STARRS ||  || align=right | 2.5 km || 
|-id=216 bgcolor=#fefefe
| 617216 ||  || — || October 16, 2006 || Catalina || CSS ||  || align=right data-sort-value="0.55" | 550 m || 
|-id=217 bgcolor=#fefefe
| 617217 ||  || — || December 19, 2003 || Kitt Peak || Spacewatch ||  || align=right data-sort-value="0.65" | 650 m || 
|-id=218 bgcolor=#E9E9E9
| 617218 ||  || — || November 20, 2003 || Kitt Peak || Kitt Peak Obs. ||  || align=right | 1.7 km || 
|-id=219 bgcolor=#E9E9E9
| 617219 ||  || — || December 26, 2003 || Piszkesteto || K. Sárneczky ||  || align=right | 1.4 km || 
|-id=220 bgcolor=#E9E9E9
| 617220 ||  || — || December 25, 2003 || Piszkesteto || K. Sárneczky ||  || align=right data-sort-value="0.90" | 900 m || 
|-id=221 bgcolor=#E9E9E9
| 617221 ||  || — || December 9, 2015 || Haleakala || Pan-STARRS ||  || align=right | 1.2 km || 
|-id=222 bgcolor=#d6d6d6
| 617222 ||  || — || February 29, 2016 || Haleakala || Pan-STARRS ||  || align=right | 2.5 km || 
|-id=223 bgcolor=#d6d6d6
| 617223 ||  || — || August 16, 2017 || Haleakala || Pan-STARRS ||  || align=right | 2.0 km || 
|-id=224 bgcolor=#d6d6d6
| 617224 ||  || — || November 19, 2008 || Mount Lemmon || Mount Lemmon Survey ||  || align=right | 1.9 km || 
|-id=225 bgcolor=#d6d6d6
| 617225 ||  || — || January 25, 2015 || Haleakala || Pan-STARRS ||  || align=right | 2.4 km || 
|-id=226 bgcolor=#fefefe
| 617226 ||  || — || February 8, 2011 || Mount Lemmon || Mount Lemmon Survey ||  || align=right data-sort-value="0.64" | 640 m || 
|-id=227 bgcolor=#E9E9E9
| 617227 ||  || — || September 24, 2011 || Haleakala || Pan-STARRS ||  || align=right data-sort-value="0.97" | 970 m || 
|-id=228 bgcolor=#d6d6d6
| 617228 ||  || — || October 8, 2008 || Mount Lemmon || Mount Lemmon Survey ||  || align=right | 2.1 km || 
|-id=229 bgcolor=#fefefe
| 617229 ||  || — || January 15, 2004 || Kitt Peak || Spacewatch ||  || align=right data-sort-value="0.47" | 470 m || 
|-id=230 bgcolor=#E9E9E9
| 617230 ||  || — || January 15, 2004 || Kitt Peak || Spacewatch ||  || align=right data-sort-value="0.81" | 810 m || 
|-id=231 bgcolor=#E9E9E9
| 617231 ||  || — || January 15, 2004 || Kitt Peak || Spacewatch ||  || align=right | 1.1 km || 
|-id=232 bgcolor=#fefefe
| 617232 ||  || — || January 15, 2004 || Kitt Peak || Spacewatch ||  || align=right data-sort-value="0.60" | 600 m || 
|-id=233 bgcolor=#d6d6d6
| 617233 ||  || — || January 15, 2004 || Kitt Peak || Spacewatch ||  || align=right | 2.5 km || 
|-id=234 bgcolor=#fefefe
| 617234 ||  || — || December 29, 2003 || Kitt Peak || Spacewatch ||  || align=right data-sort-value="0.94" | 940 m || 
|-id=235 bgcolor=#fefefe
| 617235 ||  || — || December 22, 2003 || Kitt Peak || Spacewatch ||  || align=right data-sort-value="0.62" | 620 m || 
|-id=236 bgcolor=#d6d6d6
| 617236 ||  || — || January 16, 2004 || Kitt Peak || Spacewatch ||  || align=right | 2.5 km || 
|-id=237 bgcolor=#fefefe
| 617237 ||  || — || January 17, 2004 || Kitt Peak || Spacewatch ||  || align=right data-sort-value="0.66" | 660 m || 
|-id=238 bgcolor=#fefefe
| 617238 ||  || — || January 19, 2004 || Kitt Peak || Spacewatch ||  || align=right data-sort-value="0.60" | 600 m || 
|-id=239 bgcolor=#E9E9E9
| 617239 ||  || — || November 8, 2007 || Kitt Peak || Spacewatch ||  || align=right data-sort-value="0.92" | 920 m || 
|-id=240 bgcolor=#fefefe
| 617240 ||  || — || January 17, 2004 || Palomar || NEAT ||  || align=right data-sort-value="0.83" | 830 m || 
|-id=241 bgcolor=#E9E9E9
| 617241 ||  || — || December 14, 2015 || Haleakala || Pan-STARRS ||  || align=right | 1.2 km || 
|-id=242 bgcolor=#E9E9E9
| 617242 ||  || — || January 30, 2004 || Kitt Peak || Spacewatch ||  || align=right | 1.1 km || 
|-id=243 bgcolor=#E9E9E9
| 617243 ||  || — || February 22, 2017 || Haleakala || Pan-STARRS ||  || align=right data-sort-value="0.74" | 740 m || 
|-id=244 bgcolor=#d6d6d6
| 617244 ||  || — || December 3, 2008 || Mount Lemmon || Mount Lemmon Survey ||  || align=right | 2.5 km || 
|-id=245 bgcolor=#d6d6d6
| 617245 ||  || — || January 17, 2015 || Haleakala || Pan-STARRS ||  || align=right | 2.8 km || 
|-id=246 bgcolor=#E9E9E9
| 617246 ||  || — || February 11, 2004 || Palomar || NEAT ||  || align=right | 1.6 km || 
|-id=247 bgcolor=#E9E9E9
| 617247 ||  || — || January 28, 2004 || Kitt Peak || Spacewatch ||  || align=right | 1.3 km || 
|-id=248 bgcolor=#E9E9E9
| 617248 ||  || — || February 15, 2004 || Socorro || LINEAR ||  || align=right | 1.1 km || 
|-id=249 bgcolor=#fefefe
| 617249 ||  || — || February 12, 2004 || Kitt Peak || Spacewatch ||  || align=right data-sort-value="0.58" | 580 m || 
|-id=250 bgcolor=#fefefe
| 617250 ||  || — || February 14, 2004 || Kitt Peak || Spacewatch ||  || align=right data-sort-value="0.70" | 700 m || 
|-id=251 bgcolor=#fefefe
| 617251 ||  || — || February 22, 2011 || Kitt Peak || Spacewatch ||  || align=right data-sort-value="0.62" | 620 m || 
|-id=252 bgcolor=#E9E9E9
| 617252 ||  || — || January 2, 2017 || Haleakala || Pan-STARRS ||  || align=right | 1.2 km || 
|-id=253 bgcolor=#d6d6d6
| 617253 ||  || — || July 4, 2017 || Haleakala || Pan-STARRS ||  || align=right | 2.5 km || 
|-id=254 bgcolor=#d6d6d6
| 617254 ||  || — || February 17, 2004 || Kitt Peak || Spacewatch ||  || align=right | 2.2 km || 
|-id=255 bgcolor=#E9E9E9
| 617255 ||  || — || February 17, 2004 || Kitt Peak || Spacewatch ||  || align=right | 1.2 km || 
|-id=256 bgcolor=#fefefe
| 617256 ||  || — || October 19, 2006 || Kitt Peak || Spacewatch ||  || align=right data-sort-value="0.76" | 760 m || 
|-id=257 bgcolor=#fefefe
| 617257 ||  || — || March 30, 2008 || Kitt Peak || Spacewatch ||  || align=right data-sort-value="0.77" | 770 m || 
|-id=258 bgcolor=#E9E9E9
| 617258 ||  || — || July 30, 2014 || Kitt Peak || Spacewatch ||  || align=right data-sort-value="0.81" | 810 m || 
|-id=259 bgcolor=#fefefe
| 617259 ||  || — || December 6, 2013 || Haleakala || Pan-STARRS ||  || align=right data-sort-value="0.69" | 690 m || 
|-id=260 bgcolor=#d6d6d6
| 617260 ||  || — || December 31, 2008 || Kitt Peak || Spacewatch ||  || align=right | 2.4 km || 
|-id=261 bgcolor=#d6d6d6
| 617261 ||  || — || August 21, 2006 || Kitt Peak || Spacewatch ||  || align=right | 3.0 km || 
|-id=262 bgcolor=#d6d6d6
| 617262 ||  || — || February 26, 2004 || Kitt Peak || M. W. Buie, D. E. Trilling ||  || align=right | 2.4 km || 
|-id=263 bgcolor=#fefefe
| 617263 ||  || — || February 26, 2011 || Mount Lemmon || Mount Lemmon Survey ||  || align=right data-sort-value="0.66" | 660 m || 
|-id=264 bgcolor=#d6d6d6
| 617264 ||  || — || December 22, 2008 || Mount Lemmon || Mount Lemmon Survey ||  || align=right | 2.6 km || 
|-id=265 bgcolor=#fefefe
| 617265 ||  || — || January 14, 2018 || Haleakala || Pan-STARRS ||  || align=right data-sort-value="0.64" | 640 m || 
|-id=266 bgcolor=#E9E9E9
| 617266 ||  || — || January 31, 2017 || Mount Lemmon || Mount Lemmon Survey ||  || align=right | 1.2 km || 
|-id=267 bgcolor=#fefefe
| 617267 ||  || — || September 14, 1998 || Kitt Peak || Spacewatch ||  || align=right data-sort-value="0.68" | 680 m || 
|-id=268 bgcolor=#fefefe
| 617268 ||  || — || March 14, 2004 || Kitt Peak || Spacewatch ||  || align=right data-sort-value="0.67" | 670 m || 
|-id=269 bgcolor=#fefefe
| 617269 ||  || — || March 15, 2004 || Kitt Peak || Spacewatch ||  || align=right data-sort-value="0.72" | 720 m || 
|-id=270 bgcolor=#fefefe
| 617270 ||  || — || March 15, 2004 || Kitt Peak || Spacewatch ||  || align=right data-sort-value="0.56" | 560 m || 
|-id=271 bgcolor=#E9E9E9
| 617271 ||  || — || March 15, 2004 || Kitt Peak || Spacewatch ||  || align=right | 1.2 km || 
|-id=272 bgcolor=#fefefe
| 617272 ||  || — || March 23, 2004 || Socorro || LINEAR ||  || align=right data-sort-value="0.87" | 870 m || 
|-id=273 bgcolor=#fefefe
| 617273 ||  || — || March 18, 2004 || Socorro || LINEAR ||  || align=right data-sort-value="0.62" | 620 m || 
|-id=274 bgcolor=#fefefe
| 617274 ||  || — || March 17, 2004 || Kitt Peak || Spacewatch ||  || align=right data-sort-value="0.58" | 580 m || 
|-id=275 bgcolor=#fefefe
| 617275 ||  || — || February 26, 2004 || Kitt Peak || M. W. Buie, D. E. Trilling ||  || align=right data-sort-value="0.58" | 580 m || 
|-id=276 bgcolor=#E9E9E9
| 617276 ||  || — || March 27, 2004 || Socorro || LINEAR ||  || align=right | 1.8 km || 
|-id=277 bgcolor=#d6d6d6
| 617277 ||  || — || March 16, 2004 || Kitt Peak || Spacewatch ||  || align=right | 2.3 km || 
|-id=278 bgcolor=#fefefe
| 617278 ||  || — || March 17, 2004 || Kitt Peak || Spacewatch ||  || align=right data-sort-value="0.51" | 510 m || 
|-id=279 bgcolor=#fefefe
| 617279 ||  || — || March 17, 2004 || Kitt Peak || Spacewatch ||  || align=right data-sort-value="0.80" | 800 m || 
|-id=280 bgcolor=#fefefe
| 617280 ||  || — || January 30, 2011 || Kitt Peak || Spacewatch ||  || align=right data-sort-value="0.73" | 730 m || 
|-id=281 bgcolor=#E9E9E9
| 617281 ||  || — || December 18, 2007 || Mount Lemmon || Mount Lemmon Survey ||  || align=right | 1.2 km || 
|-id=282 bgcolor=#fefefe
| 617282 ||  || — || March 6, 2011 || Mount Lemmon || Mount Lemmon Survey ||  || align=right data-sort-value="0.56" | 560 m || 
|-id=283 bgcolor=#fefefe
| 617283 ||  || — || March 30, 2011 || Haleakala || Pan-STARRS ||  || align=right data-sort-value="0.73" | 730 m || 
|-id=284 bgcolor=#d6d6d6
| 617284 ||  || — || April 9, 2015 || Mount Lemmon || Mount Lemmon Survey ||  || align=right | 2.2 km || 
|-id=285 bgcolor=#fefefe
| 617285 ||  || — || June 11, 2015 || Haleakala || Pan-STARRS ||  || align=right data-sort-value="0.72" | 720 m || 
|-id=286 bgcolor=#FA8072
| 617286 ||  || — || April 12, 2004 || Kitt Peak || Spacewatch || H || align=right data-sort-value="0.51" | 510 m || 
|-id=287 bgcolor=#fefefe
| 617287 ||  || — || April 12, 2004 || Kitt Peak || Spacewatch ||  || align=right data-sort-value="0.67" | 670 m || 
|-id=288 bgcolor=#E9E9E9
| 617288 ||  || — || April 13, 2004 || Kitt Peak || Spacewatch ||  || align=right | 1.2 km || 
|-id=289 bgcolor=#E9E9E9
| 617289 ||  || — || April 13, 2004 || Kitt Peak || Spacewatch ||  || align=right | 1.2 km || 
|-id=290 bgcolor=#d6d6d6
| 617290 ||  || — || April 13, 2004 || Kitt Peak || Spacewatch ||  || align=right | 3.1 km || 
|-id=291 bgcolor=#fefefe
| 617291 ||  || — || April 14, 2004 || Kitt Peak || Spacewatch ||  || align=right data-sort-value="0.71" | 710 m || 
|-id=292 bgcolor=#fefefe
| 617292 ||  || — || March 20, 2004 || Socorro || LINEAR ||  || align=right data-sort-value="0.64" | 640 m || 
|-id=293 bgcolor=#d6d6d6
| 617293 ||  || — || October 29, 2006 || Kitt Peak || Spacewatch ||  || align=right | 2.7 km || 
|-id=294 bgcolor=#E9E9E9
| 617294 ||  || — || April 21, 2004 || Socorro || LINEAR ||  || align=right | 1.2 km || 
|-id=295 bgcolor=#fefefe
| 617295 ||  || — || April 13, 2004 || Palomar || NEAT ||  || align=right data-sort-value="0.64" | 640 m || 
|-id=296 bgcolor=#fefefe
| 617296 ||  || — || April 20, 2004 || Socorro || LINEAR ||  || align=right data-sort-value="0.85" | 850 m || 
|-id=297 bgcolor=#fefefe
| 617297 ||  || — || April 24, 2004 || Kitt Peak || Spacewatch ||  || align=right data-sort-value="0.57" | 570 m || 
|-id=298 bgcolor=#fefefe
| 617298 ||  || — || April 22, 2004 || Kitt Peak || Spacewatch ||  || align=right data-sort-value="0.62" | 620 m || 
|-id=299 bgcolor=#d6d6d6
| 617299 ||  || — || November 2, 2007 || Mount Lemmon || Mount Lemmon Survey ||  || align=right | 3.1 km || 
|-id=300 bgcolor=#fefefe
| 617300 ||  || — || April 30, 2004 || Kitt Peak || Spacewatch ||  || align=right data-sort-value="0.79" | 790 m || 
|}

617301–617400 

|-bgcolor=#E9E9E9
| 617301 ||  || — || May 13, 2004 || Kitt Peak || Spacewatch ||  || align=right | 1.3 km || 
|-id=302 bgcolor=#fefefe
| 617302 ||  || — || May 14, 2004 || Kitt Peak || Spacewatch || H || align=right data-sort-value="0.55" | 550 m || 
|-id=303 bgcolor=#d6d6d6
| 617303 ||  || — || May 9, 2004 || Kitt Peak || Spacewatch ||  || align=right | 3.6 km || 
|-id=304 bgcolor=#E9E9E9
| 617304 ||  || — || April 16, 2004 || Apache Point || SDSS Collaboration ||  || align=right | 1.7 km || 
|-id=305 bgcolor=#fefefe
| 617305 ||  || — || May 9, 2004 || Kitt Peak || Spacewatch ||  || align=right data-sort-value="0.67" | 670 m || 
|-id=306 bgcolor=#fefefe
| 617306 ||  || — || May 19, 2004 || Kitt Peak || Spacewatch ||  || align=right data-sort-value="0.94" | 940 m || 
|-id=307 bgcolor=#d6d6d6
| 617307 ||  || — || May 18, 2004 || Campo Imperatore || D. Perna ||  || align=right | 3.6 km || 
|-id=308 bgcolor=#fefefe
| 617308 ||  || — || May 23, 2004 || Kitt Peak || Spacewatch ||  || align=right data-sort-value="0.60" | 600 m || 
|-id=309 bgcolor=#fefefe
| 617309 ||  || — || August 21, 2008 || Kitt Peak || Spacewatch ||  || align=right data-sort-value="0.62" | 620 m || 
|-id=310 bgcolor=#E9E9E9
| 617310 ||  || — || June 9, 2004 || Siding Spring || SSS ||  || align=right | 3.2 km || 
|-id=311 bgcolor=#fefefe
| 617311 ||  || — || June 25, 2004 || Kitt Peak || Spacewatch ||  || align=right data-sort-value="0.63" | 630 m || 
|-id=312 bgcolor=#fefefe
| 617312 ||  || — || July 11, 2004 || Socorro || LINEAR ||  || align=right data-sort-value="0.82" | 820 m || 
|-id=313 bgcolor=#fefefe
| 617313 ||  || — || July 15, 2004 || Siding Spring || SSS ||  || align=right data-sort-value="0.67" | 670 m || 
|-id=314 bgcolor=#fefefe
| 617314 ||  || — || July 22, 2004 || Mauna Kea || Mauna Kea Obs. ||  || align=right data-sort-value="0.54" | 540 m || 
|-id=315 bgcolor=#E9E9E9
| 617315 ||  || — || August 6, 2004 || Palomar || NEAT ||  || align=right | 1.8 km || 
|-id=316 bgcolor=#E9E9E9
| 617316 ||  || — || August 6, 2004 || Campo Imperatore || A. Boattini, A. Di Paola ||  || align=right | 2.0 km || 
|-id=317 bgcolor=#E9E9E9
| 617317 ||  || — || August 10, 2004 || Campo Imperatore || A. Boattini, F. De Luise ||  || align=right | 2.9 km || 
|-id=318 bgcolor=#E9E9E9
| 617318 ||  || — || August 8, 2004 || Anderson Mesa || LONEOS ||  || align=right | 2.6 km || 
|-id=319 bgcolor=#fefefe
| 617319 ||  || — || August 24, 2004 || Socorro || LINEAR ||  || align=right | 1.2 km || 
|-id=320 bgcolor=#fefefe
| 617320 ||  || — || August 22, 2004 || Kitt Peak || Spacewatch ||  || align=right data-sort-value="0.67" | 670 m || 
|-id=321 bgcolor=#fefefe
| 617321 ||  || — || September 9, 2008 || Mount Lemmon || Mount Lemmon Survey ||  || align=right data-sort-value="0.71" | 710 m || 
|-id=322 bgcolor=#E9E9E9
| 617322 ||  || — || May 3, 2008 || Mount Lemmon || Mount Lemmon Survey ||  || align=right | 1.5 km || 
|-id=323 bgcolor=#d6d6d6
| 617323 ||  || — || September 23, 2011 || Haleakala || Pan-STARRS || 7:4 || align=right | 2.6 km || 
|-id=324 bgcolor=#fefefe
| 617324 ||  || — || April 22, 2007 || Mount Lemmon || Mount Lemmon Survey ||  || align=right data-sort-value="0.60" | 600 m || 
|-id=325 bgcolor=#E9E9E9
| 617325 ||  || — || September 6, 2004 || Goodricke-Pigott || R. A. Tucker ||  || align=right | 2.4 km || 
|-id=326 bgcolor=#fefefe
| 617326 ||  || — || August 8, 2004 || Anderson Mesa || LONEOS ||  || align=right data-sort-value="0.79" | 790 m || 
|-id=327 bgcolor=#fefefe
| 617327 ||  || — || September 7, 2004 || Goodricke-Pigott || R. A. Tucker ||  || align=right data-sort-value="0.66" | 660 m || 
|-id=328 bgcolor=#fefefe
| 617328 ||  || — || September 8, 2004 || Bergisch Gladbach || W. Bickel ||  || align=right data-sort-value="0.67" | 670 m || 
|-id=329 bgcolor=#fefefe
| 617329 ||  || — || September 7, 2004 || Kitt Peak || Spacewatch ||  || align=right data-sort-value="0.64" | 640 m || 
|-id=330 bgcolor=#d6d6d6
| 617330 ||  || — || September 7, 2004 || Kitt Peak || Spacewatch ||  || align=right | 1.6 km || 
|-id=331 bgcolor=#d6d6d6
| 617331 ||  || — || September 7, 2004 || Kitt Peak || Spacewatch ||  || align=right | 2.2 km || 
|-id=332 bgcolor=#fefefe
| 617332 ||  || — || September 8, 2004 || Socorro || LINEAR ||  || align=right data-sort-value="0.64" | 640 m || 
|-id=333 bgcolor=#E9E9E9
| 617333 ||  || — || September 10, 2004 || Kitt Peak || Spacewatch ||  || align=right | 1.6 km || 
|-id=334 bgcolor=#d6d6d6
| 617334 ||  || — || September 10, 2004 || Kitt Peak || Spacewatch ||  || align=right | 2.3 km || 
|-id=335 bgcolor=#fefefe
| 617335 ||  || — || September 10, 2004 || Kitt Peak || Spacewatch ||  || align=right data-sort-value="0.66" | 660 m || 
|-id=336 bgcolor=#fefefe
| 617336 ||  || — || September 11, 2004 || Kitt Peak || Spacewatch ||  || align=right data-sort-value="0.58" | 580 m || 
|-id=337 bgcolor=#E9E9E9
| 617337 ||  || — || September 11, 2004 || Kitt Peak || Spacewatch ||  || align=right | 1.8 km || 
|-id=338 bgcolor=#fefefe
| 617338 ||  || — || September 11, 2004 || Kitt Peak || Spacewatch ||  || align=right data-sort-value="0.65" | 650 m || 
|-id=339 bgcolor=#E9E9E9
| 617339 ||  || — || September 11, 2004 || Kitt Peak || Spacewatch ||  || align=right | 1.8 km || 
|-id=340 bgcolor=#E9E9E9
| 617340 ||  || — || September 15, 2004 || Kitt Peak || Spacewatch ||  || align=right | 1.9 km || 
|-id=341 bgcolor=#fefefe
| 617341 ||  || — || September 15, 2004 || Kitt Peak || Spacewatch ||  || align=right data-sort-value="0.80" | 800 m || 
|-id=342 bgcolor=#fefefe
| 617342 ||  || — || September 11, 2004 || Kitt Peak || Spacewatch ||  || align=right data-sort-value="0.58" | 580 m || 
|-id=343 bgcolor=#fefefe
| 617343 ||  || — || September 12, 2004 || Socorro || LINEAR ||  || align=right data-sort-value="0.74" | 740 m || 
|-id=344 bgcolor=#fefefe
| 617344 ||  || — || September 15, 2004 || Kitt Peak || Spacewatch ||  || align=right data-sort-value="0.60" | 600 m || 
|-id=345 bgcolor=#d6d6d6
| 617345 ||  || — || September 15, 2004 || Kitt Peak || Spacewatch ||  || align=right | 1.7 km || 
|-id=346 bgcolor=#E9E9E9
| 617346 ||  || — || September 14, 2004 || Palomar || NEAT ||  || align=right | 1.9 km || 
|-id=347 bgcolor=#d6d6d6
| 617347 ||  || — || April 27, 2008 || Mount Lemmon || Mount Lemmon Survey || 7:4 || align=right | 2.8 km || 
|-id=348 bgcolor=#fefefe
| 617348 ||  || — || April 20, 2007 || Kitt Peak || Spacewatch ||  || align=right data-sort-value="0.64" | 640 m || 
|-id=349 bgcolor=#fefefe
| 617349 ||  || — || September 23, 2008 || Kitt Peak || Spacewatch ||  || align=right data-sort-value="0.71" | 710 m || 
|-id=350 bgcolor=#fefefe
| 617350 ||  || — || September 11, 2004 || Kitt Peak || Spacewatch ||  || align=right data-sort-value="0.64" | 640 m || 
|-id=351 bgcolor=#fefefe
| 617351 ||  || — || February 5, 2016 || Mount Lemmon || Mount Lemmon Survey || H || align=right data-sort-value="0.42" | 420 m || 
|-id=352 bgcolor=#d6d6d6
| 617352 ||  || — || March 29, 2012 || Kitt Peak || Spacewatch ||  || align=right | 1.8 km || 
|-id=353 bgcolor=#E9E9E9
| 617353 ||  || — || December 10, 2010 || Mount Lemmon || Mount Lemmon Survey ||  || align=right | 1.8 km || 
|-id=354 bgcolor=#d6d6d6
| 617354 ||  || — || September 28, 2009 || Kitt Peak || Spacewatch ||  || align=right | 1.5 km || 
|-id=355 bgcolor=#fefefe
| 617355 ||  || — || September 17, 2004 || Kitt Peak || Spacewatch ||  || align=right data-sort-value="0.59" | 590 m || 
|-id=356 bgcolor=#fefefe
| 617356 ||  || — || August 22, 2004 || Kitt Peak || Spacewatch ||  || align=right data-sort-value="0.58" | 580 m || 
|-id=357 bgcolor=#d6d6d6
| 617357 ||  || — || November 17, 2014 || Haleakala || Pan-STARRS ||  || align=right | 1.8 km || 
|-id=358 bgcolor=#fefefe
| 617358 ||  || — || March 11, 2007 || Kitt Peak || Spacewatch ||  || align=right data-sort-value="0.67" | 670 m || 
|-id=359 bgcolor=#E9E9E9
| 617359 ||  || — || August 17, 2013 || Haleakala || Pan-STARRS ||  || align=right | 1.6 km || 
|-id=360 bgcolor=#fefefe
| 617360 ||  || — || September 17, 2004 || Kitt Peak || Spacewatch ||  || align=right data-sort-value="0.56" | 560 m || 
|-id=361 bgcolor=#fefefe
| 617361 ||  || — || October 4, 2004 || Kitt Peak || Spacewatch ||  || align=right data-sort-value="0.67" | 670 m || 
|-id=362 bgcolor=#fefefe
| 617362 ||  || — || September 22, 2004 || Kitt Peak || Spacewatch ||  || align=right data-sort-value="0.52" | 520 m || 
|-id=363 bgcolor=#fefefe
| 617363 ||  || — || October 4, 2004 || Kitt Peak || Spacewatch ||  || align=right data-sort-value="0.84" | 840 m || 
|-id=364 bgcolor=#E9E9E9
| 617364 ||  || — || October 4, 2004 || Kitt Peak || Spacewatch ||  || align=right | 1.6 km || 
|-id=365 bgcolor=#fefefe
| 617365 ||  || — || October 5, 2004 || Kitt Peak || Spacewatch ||  || align=right data-sort-value="0.51" | 510 m || 
|-id=366 bgcolor=#d6d6d6
| 617366 ||  || — || October 4, 2004 || Kitt Peak || Spacewatch ||  || align=right | 1.6 km || 
|-id=367 bgcolor=#fefefe
| 617367 ||  || — || October 5, 2004 || Kitt Peak || Spacewatch ||  || align=right data-sort-value="0.64" | 640 m || 
|-id=368 bgcolor=#fefefe
| 617368 ||  || — || October 5, 2004 || Kitt Peak || Spacewatch ||  || align=right data-sort-value="0.67" | 670 m || 
|-id=369 bgcolor=#fefefe
| 617369 ||  || — || September 9, 2004 || Kitt Peak || Spacewatch ||  || align=right data-sort-value="0.67" | 670 m || 
|-id=370 bgcolor=#fefefe
| 617370 ||  || — || October 9, 2004 || Kitt Peak || Spacewatch ||  || align=right data-sort-value="0.62" | 620 m || 
|-id=371 bgcolor=#d6d6d6
| 617371 ||  || — || October 9, 2004 || Kitt Peak || Spacewatch ||  || align=right | 1.7 km || 
|-id=372 bgcolor=#fefefe
| 617372 ||  || — || October 9, 2004 || Kitt Peak || Spacewatch ||  || align=right data-sort-value="0.68" | 680 m || 
|-id=373 bgcolor=#fefefe
| 617373 ||  || — || October 10, 2004 || Kitt Peak || Spacewatch ||  || align=right data-sort-value="0.62" | 620 m || 
|-id=374 bgcolor=#d6d6d6
| 617374 ||  || — || October 13, 2004 || Kitt Peak || Spacewatch ||  || align=right | 1.8 km || 
|-id=375 bgcolor=#fefefe
| 617375 ||  || — || October 13, 2004 || Kitt Peak || Spacewatch ||  || align=right data-sort-value="0.87" | 870 m || 
|-id=376 bgcolor=#fefefe
| 617376 ||  || — || September 11, 2004 || Kitt Peak || Spacewatch ||  || align=right data-sort-value="0.81" | 810 m || 
|-id=377 bgcolor=#fefefe
| 617377 ||  || — || October 10, 2004 || Kitt Peak || Spacewatch ||  || align=right data-sort-value="0.58" | 580 m || 
|-id=378 bgcolor=#fefefe
| 617378 ||  || — || October 11, 2004 || Kitt Peak || Spacewatch ||  || align=right data-sort-value="0.63" | 630 m || 
|-id=379 bgcolor=#E9E9E9
| 617379 ||  || — || August 29, 2013 || Haleakala || Pan-STARRS ||  || align=right | 1.7 km || 
|-id=380 bgcolor=#E9E9E9
| 617380 ||  || — || August 15, 2013 || Haleakala || Pan-STARRS ||  || align=right | 1.6 km || 
|-id=381 bgcolor=#E9E9E9
| 617381 ||  || — || October 15, 2004 || Kitt Peak || Spacewatch ||  || align=right | 1.8 km || 
|-id=382 bgcolor=#E9E9E9
| 617382 ||  || — || October 15, 2004 || Kitt Peak || M. W. Buie, D. E. Trilling ||  || align=right | 1.6 km || 
|-id=383 bgcolor=#d6d6d6
| 617383 ||  || — || October 23, 2004 || Kitt Peak || Spacewatch ||  || align=right | 2.0 km || 
|-id=384 bgcolor=#fefefe
| 617384 ||  || — || October 8, 2004 || Kitt Peak || Spacewatch ||  || align=right data-sort-value="0.84" | 840 m || 
|-id=385 bgcolor=#fefefe
| 617385 ||  || — || November 4, 2004 || Kitt Peak || Spacewatch || H || align=right data-sort-value="0.36" | 360 m || 
|-id=386 bgcolor=#fefefe
| 617386 ||  || — || November 11, 2004 || Kitt Peak || Spacewatch ||  || align=right data-sort-value="0.56" | 560 m || 
|-id=387 bgcolor=#fefefe
| 617387 ||  || — || January 25, 2006 || Kitt Peak || Spacewatch ||  || align=right data-sort-value="0.85" | 850 m || 
|-id=388 bgcolor=#fefefe
| 617388 ||  || — || February 27, 2012 || Haleakala || Pan-STARRS ||  || align=right data-sort-value="0.57" | 570 m || 
|-id=389 bgcolor=#d6d6d6
| 617389 ||  || — || December 14, 2004 || Junk Bond || D. Healy ||  || align=right | 2.1 km || 
|-id=390 bgcolor=#d6d6d6
| 617390 ||  || — || December 13, 2004 || Kitt Peak || Spacewatch ||  || align=right | 2.5 km || 
|-id=391 bgcolor=#fefefe
| 617391 ||  || — || February 3, 2009 || Mount Lemmon || Mount Lemmon Survey ||  || align=right data-sort-value="0.88" | 880 m || 
|-id=392 bgcolor=#fefefe
| 617392 ||  || — || August 28, 2011 || Siding Spring || SSS ||  || align=right data-sort-value="0.81" | 810 m || 
|-id=393 bgcolor=#C2FFFF
| 617393 ||  || — || December 19, 2004 || Mount Lemmon || Mount Lemmon Survey || L5 || align=right | 9.3 km || 
|-id=394 bgcolor=#E9E9E9
| 617394 ||  || — || December 20, 2004 || Mount Lemmon || Mount Lemmon Survey ||  || align=right | 1.2 km || 
|-id=395 bgcolor=#d6d6d6
| 617395 ||  || — || December 19, 2004 || Mount Lemmon || Mount Lemmon Survey ||  || align=right | 1.7 km || 
|-id=396 bgcolor=#E9E9E9
| 617396 ||  || — || December 19, 2004 || Mount Lemmon || Mount Lemmon Survey ||  || align=right data-sort-value="0.69" | 690 m || 
|-id=397 bgcolor=#C2FFFF
| 617397 ||  || — || December 13, 2004 || Kitt Peak || Spacewatch || L5 || align=right | 10 km || 
|-id=398 bgcolor=#fefefe
| 617398 ||  || — || January 13, 2005 || Kitt Peak || Spacewatch ||  || align=right | 1.1 km || 
|-id=399 bgcolor=#d6d6d6
| 617399 ||  || — || January 13, 2005 || Kitt Peak || Spacewatch ||  || align=right | 2.2 km || 
|-id=400 bgcolor=#d6d6d6
| 617400 ||  || — || January 15, 2005 || Kitt Peak || Spacewatch ||  || align=right | 2.8 km || 
|}

617401–617500 

|-bgcolor=#d6d6d6
| 617401 ||  || — || January 17, 2005 || Klet || M. Tichý ||  || align=right | 2.4 km || 
|-id=402 bgcolor=#C2FFFF
| 617402 ||  || — || January 16, 2005 || Mauna Kea || Mauna Kea Obs. || L5 || align=right | 7.0 km || 
|-id=403 bgcolor=#d6d6d6
| 617403 ||  || — || January 16, 2005 || Mauna Kea || Mauna Kea Obs. ||  || align=right | 2.5 km || 
|-id=404 bgcolor=#C2FFFF
| 617404 ||  || — || June 22, 2010 || Mount Lemmon || Mount Lemmon Survey || L5 || align=right | 12 km || 
|-id=405 bgcolor=#d6d6d6
| 617405 ||  || — || December 20, 2004 || Mount Lemmon || Mount Lemmon Survey ||  || align=right | 2.2 km || 
|-id=406 bgcolor=#d6d6d6
| 617406 ||  || — || February 4, 2005 || Mount Lemmon || Mount Lemmon Survey ||  || align=right | 2.4 km || 
|-id=407 bgcolor=#E9E9E9
| 617407 ||  || — || February 9, 2005 || Mount Lemmon || Mount Lemmon Survey ||  || align=right data-sort-value="0.76" | 760 m || 
|-id=408 bgcolor=#d6d6d6
| 617408 ||  || — || February 4, 2005 || Kitt Peak || Spacewatch ||  || align=right | 2.1 km || 
|-id=409 bgcolor=#E9E9E9
| 617409 ||  || — || May 28, 2014 || Mount Lemmon || Mount Lemmon Survey ||  || align=right data-sort-value="0.70" | 700 m || 
|-id=410 bgcolor=#E9E9E9
| 617410 ||  || — || March 3, 2005 || Kitt Peak || Spacewatch ||  || align=right data-sort-value="0.91" | 910 m || 
|-id=411 bgcolor=#d6d6d6
| 617411 ||  || — || March 9, 2005 || Kitt Peak || Spacewatch ||  || align=right | 1.9 km || 
|-id=412 bgcolor=#d6d6d6
| 617412 ||  || — || March 11, 2005 || Mount Lemmon || Mount Lemmon Survey ||  || align=right | 2.1 km || 
|-id=413 bgcolor=#E9E9E9
| 617413 ||  || — || March 11, 2005 || Mount Lemmon || Mount Lemmon Survey ||  || align=right data-sort-value="0.73" | 730 m || 
|-id=414 bgcolor=#E9E9E9
| 617414 ||  || — || October 18, 2003 || Kitt Peak || Spacewatch ||  || align=right data-sort-value="0.73" | 730 m || 
|-id=415 bgcolor=#E9E9E9
| 617415 ||  || — || March 8, 2005 || Anderson Mesa || LONEOS ||  || align=right | 1.2 km || 
|-id=416 bgcolor=#fefefe
| 617416 ||  || — || March 15, 2005 || Mount Lemmon || Mount Lemmon Survey || H || align=right data-sort-value="0.67" | 670 m || 
|-id=417 bgcolor=#d6d6d6
| 617417 ||  || — || September 17, 2012 || Mount Lemmon || Mount Lemmon Survey ||  || align=right | 2.3 km || 
|-id=418 bgcolor=#fefefe
| 617418 ||  || — || January 16, 2005 || Kitt Peak || Spacewatch ||  || align=right data-sort-value="0.58" | 580 m || 
|-id=419 bgcolor=#fefefe
| 617419 ||  || — || March 8, 2005 || Mount Lemmon || Mount Lemmon Survey ||  || align=right data-sort-value="0.60" | 600 m || 
|-id=420 bgcolor=#fefefe
| 617420 ||  || — || March 9, 2005 || Mount Lemmon || Mount Lemmon Survey ||  || align=right data-sort-value="0.53" | 530 m || 
|-id=421 bgcolor=#E9E9E9
| 617421 ||  || — || February 16, 2013 || Mount Lemmon || Mount Lemmon Survey ||  || align=right data-sort-value="0.85" | 850 m || 
|-id=422 bgcolor=#d6d6d6
| 617422 ||  || — || October 27, 2008 || Mount Lemmon || Mount Lemmon Survey ||  || align=right | 1.9 km || 
|-id=423 bgcolor=#fefefe
| 617423 ||  || — || January 13, 2008 || Kitt Peak || Spacewatch ||  || align=right data-sort-value="0.54" | 540 m || 
|-id=424 bgcolor=#fefefe
| 617424 ||  || — || March 17, 2005 || Catalina || CSS ||  || align=right data-sort-value="0.75" | 750 m || 
|-id=425 bgcolor=#d6d6d6
| 617425 ||  || — || February 15, 2015 || Haleakala || Pan-STARRS ||  || align=right | 2.0 km || 
|-id=426 bgcolor=#d6d6d6
| 617426 ||  || — || March 17, 2005 || Mount Lemmon || Mount Lemmon Survey ||  || align=right | 2.0 km || 
|-id=427 bgcolor=#fefefe
| 617427 ||  || — || January 16, 2005 || Kitt Peak || Spacewatch ||  || align=right data-sort-value="0.45" | 450 m || 
|-id=428 bgcolor=#E9E9E9
| 617428 ||  || — || April 5, 2005 || Mount Lemmon || Mount Lemmon Survey ||  || align=right data-sort-value="0.90" | 900 m || 
|-id=429 bgcolor=#E9E9E9
| 617429 ||  || — || April 2, 2005 || Catalina || CSS ||  || align=right | 1.0 km || 
|-id=430 bgcolor=#E9E9E9
| 617430 ||  || — || April 2, 2005 || Mount Lemmon || Mount Lemmon Survey ||  || align=right data-sort-value="0.85" | 850 m || 
|-id=431 bgcolor=#d6d6d6
| 617431 ||  || — || March 3, 2005 || Catalina || CSS ||  || align=right | 2.5 km || 
|-id=432 bgcolor=#E9E9E9
| 617432 ||  || — || April 10, 2005 || Kitt Peak || Spacewatch ||  || align=right data-sort-value="0.94" | 940 m || 
|-id=433 bgcolor=#d6d6d6
| 617433 ||  || — || April 10, 2005 || Kitt Peak || Spacewatch ||  || align=right | 2.4 km || 
|-id=434 bgcolor=#fefefe
| 617434 ||  || — || April 7, 2005 || Kitt Peak || Spacewatch ||  || align=right data-sort-value="0.72" | 720 m || 
|-id=435 bgcolor=#E9E9E9
| 617435 ||  || — || April 2, 2009 || Mount Lemmon || Mount Lemmon Survey ||  || align=right data-sort-value="0.84" | 840 m || 
|-id=436 bgcolor=#d6d6d6
| 617436 ||  || — || April 11, 2005 || Mount Lemmon || Mount Lemmon Survey || 3:2 || align=right | 4.0 km || 
|-id=437 bgcolor=#fefefe
| 617437 ||  || — || February 13, 2008 || Kitt Peak || Spacewatch ||  || align=right data-sort-value="0.53" | 530 m || 
|-id=438 bgcolor=#E9E9E9
| 617438 ||  || — || April 2, 2005 || Mount Lemmon || Mount Lemmon Survey ||  || align=right data-sort-value="0.81" | 810 m || 
|-id=439 bgcolor=#d6d6d6
| 617439 ||  || — || April 7, 2005 || Mount Lemmon || Mount Lemmon Survey ||  || align=right | 2.8 km || 
|-id=440 bgcolor=#E9E9E9
| 617440 ||  || — || May 4, 2005 || Mauna Kea || Mauna Kea Obs. ||  || align=right | 1.1 km || 
|-id=441 bgcolor=#E9E9E9
| 617441 ||  || — || May 3, 2005 || Catalina || CSS ||  || align=right | 1.0 km || 
|-id=442 bgcolor=#fefefe
| 617442 ||  || — || May 4, 2005 || Kitt Peak || Spacewatch ||  || align=right data-sort-value="0.77" | 770 m || 
|-id=443 bgcolor=#d6d6d6
| 617443 ||  || — || May 4, 2005 || Kitt Peak || Spacewatch ||  || align=right | 2.8 km || 
|-id=444 bgcolor=#fefefe
| 617444 ||  || — || May 8, 2005 || Mount Lemmon || Mount Lemmon Survey ||  || align=right data-sort-value="0.53" | 530 m || 
|-id=445 bgcolor=#E9E9E9
| 617445 ||  || — || September 15, 2006 || Kitt Peak || Spacewatch ||  || align=right | 1.3 km || 
|-id=446 bgcolor=#d6d6d6
| 617446 ||  || — || April 4, 2005 || Mount Lemmon || Mount Lemmon Survey ||  || align=right | 2.5 km || 
|-id=447 bgcolor=#d6d6d6
| 617447 ||  || — || May 4, 2005 || Kitt Peak || Spacewatch ||  || align=right | 3.2 km || 
|-id=448 bgcolor=#fefefe
| 617448 ||  || — || May 4, 2005 || Kitt Peak || Spacewatch ||  || align=right data-sort-value="0.44" | 440 m || 
|-id=449 bgcolor=#E9E9E9
| 617449 ||  || — || August 28, 2006 || Siding Spring || SSS ||  || align=right | 1.1 km || 
|-id=450 bgcolor=#E9E9E9
| 617450 ||  || — || May 14, 2005 || Mount Lemmon || Mount Lemmon Survey ||  || align=right | 1.4 km || 
|-id=451 bgcolor=#fefefe
| 617451 ||  || — || May 14, 2009 || Mount Lemmon || Mount Lemmon Survey ||  || align=right data-sort-value="0.75" | 750 m || 
|-id=452 bgcolor=#d6d6d6
| 617452 ||  || — || May 15, 2005 || Mount Lemmon || Mount Lemmon Survey ||  || align=right | 2.9 km || 
|-id=453 bgcolor=#E9E9E9
| 617453 ||  || — || June 3, 2005 || Kitt Peak || Spacewatch ||  || align=right | 1.1 km || 
|-id=454 bgcolor=#fefefe
| 617454 ||  || — || June 13, 2005 || Mount Lemmon || Mount Lemmon Survey ||  || align=right data-sort-value="0.48" | 480 m || 
|-id=455 bgcolor=#fefefe
| 617455 ||  || — || June 10, 2005 || Kitt Peak || Spacewatch ||  || align=right data-sort-value="0.58" | 580 m || 
|-id=456 bgcolor=#fefefe
| 617456 ||  || — || March 12, 2008 || Mount Lemmon || Mount Lemmon Survey ||  || align=right data-sort-value="0.72" | 720 m || 
|-id=457 bgcolor=#fefefe
| 617457 ||  || — || June 15, 2005 || Mount Lemmon || Mount Lemmon Survey ||  || align=right data-sort-value="0.87" | 870 m || 
|-id=458 bgcolor=#E9E9E9
| 617458 ||  || — || June 29, 2005 || Kitt Peak || Spacewatch ||  || align=right | 1.9 km || 
|-id=459 bgcolor=#fefefe
| 617459 ||  || — || June 30, 2005 || Kitt Peak || Spacewatch ||  || align=right data-sort-value="0.63" | 630 m || 
|-id=460 bgcolor=#E9E9E9
| 617460 ||  || — || June 27, 2005 || Kitt Peak || Spacewatch ||  || align=right | 1.7 km || 
|-id=461 bgcolor=#fefefe
| 617461 ||  || — || March 25, 2001 || Kitt Peak || M. W. Buie, S. D. Kern ||  || align=right data-sort-value="0.52" | 520 m || 
|-id=462 bgcolor=#E9E9E9
| 617462 ||  || — || June 29, 2005 || Palomar || NEAT ||  || align=right | 1.0 km || 
|-id=463 bgcolor=#E9E9E9
| 617463 ||  || — || June 29, 2005 || Kitt Peak || Spacewatch ||  || align=right | 1.6 km || 
|-id=464 bgcolor=#fefefe
| 617464 ||  || — || June 30, 2005 || Kitt Peak || Spacewatch ||  || align=right data-sort-value="0.55" | 550 m || 
|-id=465 bgcolor=#E9E9E9
| 617465 ||  || — || June 30, 2014 || Haleakala || Pan-STARRS ||  || align=right | 1.6 km || 
|-id=466 bgcolor=#fefefe
| 617466 ||  || — || July 2, 2005 || Kitt Peak || Spacewatch ||  || align=right data-sort-value="0.60" | 600 m || 
|-id=467 bgcolor=#E9E9E9
| 617467 ||  || — || July 2, 2005 || Kitt Peak || Spacewatch ||  || align=right | 1.6 km || 
|-id=468 bgcolor=#E9E9E9
| 617468 ||  || — || June 18, 2005 || Mount Lemmon || Mount Lemmon Survey ||  || align=right | 1.8 km || 
|-id=469 bgcolor=#E9E9E9
| 617469 ||  || — || July 5, 2005 || Kitt Peak || Spacewatch ||  || align=right | 1.2 km || 
|-id=470 bgcolor=#d6d6d6
| 617470 ||  || — || July 5, 2005 || Palomar || NEAT ||  || align=right | 3.1 km || 
|-id=471 bgcolor=#E9E9E9
| 617471 ||  || — || July 9, 2005 || Kitt Peak || Spacewatch ||  || align=right | 1.4 km || 
|-id=472 bgcolor=#fefefe
| 617472 ||  || — || July 11, 2005 || Kitt Peak || Spacewatch ||  || align=right data-sort-value="0.82" | 820 m || 
|-id=473 bgcolor=#E9E9E9
| 617473 ||  || — || July 11, 2005 || Kitt Peak || Spacewatch ||  || align=right | 1.2 km || 
|-id=474 bgcolor=#fefefe
| 617474 ||  || — || July 2, 2005 || Kitt Peak || Spacewatch ||  || align=right data-sort-value="0.54" | 540 m || 
|-id=475 bgcolor=#fefefe
| 617475 ||  || — || July 5, 2005 || Kitt Peak || Spacewatch ||  || align=right data-sort-value="0.53" | 530 m || 
|-id=476 bgcolor=#E9E9E9
| 617476 ||  || — || July 1, 2005 || Kitt Peak || Spacewatch ||  || align=right | 1.2 km || 
|-id=477 bgcolor=#fefefe
| 617477 ||  || — || July 4, 2005 || Mount Lemmon || Mount Lemmon Survey ||  || align=right data-sort-value="0.60" | 600 m || 
|-id=478 bgcolor=#fefefe
| 617478 ||  || — || July 15, 2005 || Mount Lemmon || Mount Lemmon Survey ||  || align=right data-sort-value="0.65" | 650 m || 
|-id=479 bgcolor=#E9E9E9
| 617479 ||  || — || July 7, 2005 || Mauna Kea || Mauna Kea Obs. ||  || align=right | 1.1 km || 
|-id=480 bgcolor=#fefefe
| 617480 ||  || — || July 5, 2005 || Mount Lemmon || Mount Lemmon Survey ||  || align=right data-sort-value="0.75" | 750 m || 
|-id=481 bgcolor=#fefefe
| 617481 ||  || — || April 30, 2008 || Kitt Peak || Spacewatch ||  || align=right data-sort-value="0.63" | 630 m || 
|-id=482 bgcolor=#E9E9E9
| 617482 ||  || — || November 13, 2006 || Kitt Peak || Spacewatch ||  || align=right | 1.4 km || 
|-id=483 bgcolor=#fefefe
| 617483 ||  || — || May 4, 2016 || Kitt Peak || Spacewatch || H || align=right data-sort-value="0.62" | 620 m || 
|-id=484 bgcolor=#E9E9E9
| 617484 ||  || — || December 13, 2015 || Haleakala || Pan-STARRS ||  || align=right | 1.2 km || 
|-id=485 bgcolor=#d6d6d6
| 617485 ||  || — || July 5, 2005 || Mount Lemmon || Mount Lemmon Survey ||  || align=right | 3.4 km || 
|-id=486 bgcolor=#E9E9E9
| 617486 ||  || — || July 4, 2005 || Palomar || NEAT ||  || align=right | 1.2 km || 
|-id=487 bgcolor=#fefefe
| 617487 ||  || — || June 19, 2012 || Mount Lemmon || Mount Lemmon Survey ||  || align=right data-sort-value="0.73" | 730 m || 
|-id=488 bgcolor=#d6d6d6
| 617488 ||  || — || December 13, 2012 || Kitt Peak || Spacewatch ||  || align=right | 3.6 km || 
|-id=489 bgcolor=#fefefe
| 617489 ||  || — || April 7, 2008 || Kitt Peak || Spacewatch ||  || align=right data-sort-value="0.49" | 490 m || 
|-id=490 bgcolor=#fefefe
| 617490 ||  || — || April 7, 2008 || Kitt Peak || Spacewatch ||  || align=right data-sort-value="0.66" | 660 m || 
|-id=491 bgcolor=#E9E9E9
| 617491 ||  || — || February 9, 2008 || Mount Lemmon || Mount Lemmon Survey ||  || align=right | 1.5 km || 
|-id=492 bgcolor=#E9E9E9
| 617492 ||  || — || August 9, 2005 || Cerro Tololo || Cerro Tololo Obs. ||  || align=right | 1.6 km || 
|-id=493 bgcolor=#FA8072
| 617493 ||  || — || July 29, 2005 || Palomar || NEAT ||  || align=right data-sort-value="0.53" | 530 m || 
|-id=494 bgcolor=#E9E9E9
| 617494 ||  || — || August 25, 2005 || Palomar || NEAT ||  || align=right | 2.0 km || 
|-id=495 bgcolor=#fefefe
| 617495 ||  || — || August 28, 2005 || Junk Bond || D. Healy ||  || align=right data-sort-value="0.74" | 740 m || 
|-id=496 bgcolor=#fefefe
| 617496 ||  || — || August 6, 2005 || Palomar || NEAT ||  || align=right data-sort-value="0.70" | 700 m || 
|-id=497 bgcolor=#fefefe
| 617497 ||  || — || August 25, 2005 || Palomar || NEAT ||  || align=right data-sort-value="0.67" | 670 m || 
|-id=498 bgcolor=#E9E9E9
| 617498 ||  || — || August 26, 2005 || Palomar || NEAT ||  || align=right | 2.1 km || 
|-id=499 bgcolor=#E9E9E9
| 617499 ||  || — || August 25, 2005 || Palomar || NEAT ||  || align=right | 1.7 km || 
|-id=500 bgcolor=#fefefe
| 617500 ||  || — || August 26, 2005 || Palomar || NEAT ||  || align=right data-sort-value="0.48" | 480 m || 
|}

617501–617600 

|-bgcolor=#E9E9E9
| 617501 ||  || — || August 29, 2005 || Kitt Peak || Spacewatch ||  || align=right | 1.3 km || 
|-id=502 bgcolor=#E9E9E9
| 617502 ||  || — || August 30, 2005 || Kitt Peak || Spacewatch ||  || align=right | 1.1 km || 
|-id=503 bgcolor=#fefefe
| 617503 ||  || — || August 30, 2005 || Kitt Peak || Spacewatch ||  || align=right data-sort-value="0.76" | 760 m || 
|-id=504 bgcolor=#E9E9E9
| 617504 ||  || — || August 30, 2005 || Kitt Peak || Spacewatch ||  || align=right | 2.1 km || 
|-id=505 bgcolor=#E9E9E9
| 617505 ||  || — || August 31, 2005 || Kitt Peak || Spacewatch ||  || align=right | 1.7 km || 
|-id=506 bgcolor=#E9E9E9
| 617506 ||  || — || August 28, 2005 || Kitt Peak || Spacewatch ||  || align=right | 2.0 km || 
|-id=507 bgcolor=#fefefe
| 617507 ||  || — || August 26, 2005 || Palomar || NEAT ||  || align=right data-sort-value="0.68" | 680 m || 
|-id=508 bgcolor=#d6d6d6
| 617508 ||  || — || July 29, 2005 || Palomar || NEAT ||  || align=right | 3.7 km || 
|-id=509 bgcolor=#fefefe
| 617509 ||  || — || August 30, 2005 || Kitt Peak || Spacewatch ||  || align=right data-sort-value="0.58" | 580 m || 
|-id=510 bgcolor=#d6d6d6
| 617510 ||  || — || August 30, 2005 || Palomar || NEAT ||  || align=right | 2.8 km || 
|-id=511 bgcolor=#E9E9E9
| 617511 ||  || — || August 31, 2005 || Kitt Peak || Spacewatch ||  || align=right | 1.9 km || 
|-id=512 bgcolor=#d6d6d6
| 617512 ||  || — || August 31, 2005 || Kitt Peak || Spacewatch ||  || align=right | 2.9 km || 
|-id=513 bgcolor=#E9E9E9
| 617513 ||  || — || August 24, 2005 || Palomar || NEAT ||  || align=right | 1.2 km || 
|-id=514 bgcolor=#E9E9E9
| 617514 ||  || — || August 28, 2005 || Kitt Peak || Spacewatch ||  || align=right | 1.2 km || 
|-id=515 bgcolor=#E9E9E9
| 617515 ||  || — || October 11, 2010 || Mount Lemmon || Mount Lemmon Survey ||  || align=right | 1.8 km || 
|-id=516 bgcolor=#E9E9E9
| 617516 ||  || — || November 11, 2010 || Mount Lemmon || Mount Lemmon Survey ||  || align=right | 1.6 km || 
|-id=517 bgcolor=#fefefe
| 617517 ||  || — || August 29, 2005 || Kitt Peak || Spacewatch ||  || align=right data-sort-value="0.57" | 570 m || 
|-id=518 bgcolor=#E9E9E9
| 617518 ||  || — || February 11, 2012 || Mount Lemmon || Mount Lemmon Survey ||  || align=right | 1.5 km || 
|-id=519 bgcolor=#E9E9E9
| 617519 ||  || — || August 31, 2005 || Kitt Peak || Spacewatch ||  || align=right | 1.1 km || 
|-id=520 bgcolor=#fefefe
| 617520 ||  || — || February 8, 2007 || Mount Lemmon || Mount Lemmon Survey ||  || align=right data-sort-value="0.53" | 530 m || 
|-id=521 bgcolor=#fefefe
| 617521 ||  || — || August 27, 2005 || Palomar || NEAT ||  || align=right data-sort-value="0.46" | 460 m || 
|-id=522 bgcolor=#E9E9E9
| 617522 ||  || — || September 3, 2005 || Pla D'Arguines || R. Ferrando, M. Ferrando ||  || align=right | 2.3 km || 
|-id=523 bgcolor=#fefefe
| 617523 ||  || — || August 25, 2005 || Palomar || NEAT ||  || align=right data-sort-value="0.54" | 540 m || 
|-id=524 bgcolor=#fefefe
| 617524 ||  || — || August 26, 2005 || Anderson Mesa || LONEOS ||  || align=right data-sort-value="0.54" | 540 m || 
|-id=525 bgcolor=#fefefe
| 617525 ||  || — || September 23, 2005 || Kitt Peak || Spacewatch ||  || align=right data-sort-value="0.64" | 640 m || 
|-id=526 bgcolor=#fefefe
| 617526 ||  || — || March 23, 2004 || Kitt Peak || Spacewatch ||  || align=right data-sort-value="0.62" | 620 m || 
|-id=527 bgcolor=#E9E9E9
| 617527 ||  || — || February 26, 2008 || Mount Lemmon || Mount Lemmon Survey ||  || align=right | 1.2 km || 
|-id=528 bgcolor=#d6d6d6
| 617528 ||  || — || September 4, 2011 || Kitt Peak || Spacewatch ||  || align=right | 3.1 km || 
|-id=529 bgcolor=#fefefe
| 617529 ||  || — || December 31, 2013 || Mount Lemmon || Mount Lemmon Survey ||  || align=right data-sort-value="0.75" | 750 m || 
|-id=530 bgcolor=#fefefe
| 617530 ||  || — || September 1, 2005 || Kitt Peak || Spacewatch ||  || align=right data-sort-value="0.56" | 560 m || 
|-id=531 bgcolor=#fefefe
| 617531 ||  || — || September 1, 2005 || Palomar || NEAT ||  || align=right data-sort-value="0.83" | 830 m || 
|-id=532 bgcolor=#E9E9E9
| 617532 ||  || — || February 16, 2012 || Haleakala || Pan-STARRS ||  || align=right | 1.6 km || 
|-id=533 bgcolor=#E9E9E9
| 617533 ||  || — || August 29, 2005 || Palomar || NEAT ||  || align=right | 1.1 km || 
|-id=534 bgcolor=#E9E9E9
| 617534 ||  || — || September 23, 2005 || Junk Bond || D. Healy ||  || align=right | 1.7 km || 
|-id=535 bgcolor=#E9E9E9
| 617535 ||  || — || August 26, 2005 || Palomar || NEAT ||  || align=right | 1.2 km || 
|-id=536 bgcolor=#fefefe
| 617536 ||  || — || August 30, 2005 || Palomar || NEAT ||  || align=right data-sort-value="0.98" | 980 m || 
|-id=537 bgcolor=#E9E9E9
| 617537 ||  || — || September 24, 2005 || Kitt Peak || Spacewatch ||  || align=right | 1.5 km || 
|-id=538 bgcolor=#d6d6d6
| 617538 ||  || — || September 24, 2005 || Kitt Peak || Spacewatch ||  || align=right | 2.0 km || 
|-id=539 bgcolor=#fefefe
| 617539 ||  || — || August 31, 2005 || Palomar || NEAT ||  || align=right | 1.0 km || 
|-id=540 bgcolor=#E9E9E9
| 617540 ||  || — || September 26, 2005 || Kitt Peak || Spacewatch ||  || align=right | 1.7 km || 
|-id=541 bgcolor=#E9E9E9
| 617541 ||  || — || September 24, 2005 || Kitt Peak || Spacewatch ||  || align=right | 1.1 km || 
|-id=542 bgcolor=#fefefe
| 617542 ||  || — || September 24, 2005 || Kitt Peak || Spacewatch ||  || align=right data-sort-value="0.62" | 620 m || 
|-id=543 bgcolor=#fefefe
| 617543 ||  || — || September 1, 2005 || Campo Imperatore || A. Boattini ||  || align=right data-sort-value="0.66" | 660 m || 
|-id=544 bgcolor=#E9E9E9
| 617544 ||  || — || September 1, 2005 || Palomar || NEAT ||  || align=right | 1.2 km || 
|-id=545 bgcolor=#E9E9E9
| 617545 ||  || — || August 29, 2005 || Palomar || NEAT ||  || align=right | 1.5 km || 
|-id=546 bgcolor=#fefefe
| 617546 ||  || — || August 31, 2005 || Palomar || NEAT ||  || align=right data-sort-value="0.74" | 740 m || 
|-id=547 bgcolor=#fefefe
| 617547 ||  || — || September 24, 2005 || Kitt Peak || Spacewatch ||  || align=right data-sort-value="0.72" | 720 m || 
|-id=548 bgcolor=#fefefe
| 617548 ||  || — || August 31, 2005 || Palomar || NEAT ||  || align=right data-sort-value="0.75" | 750 m || 
|-id=549 bgcolor=#E9E9E9
| 617549 ||  || — || September 25, 2005 || Kitt Peak || Spacewatch ||  || align=right | 1.5 km || 
|-id=550 bgcolor=#fefefe
| 617550 ||  || — || September 29, 2005 || Kitt Peak || Spacewatch ||  || align=right data-sort-value="0.61" | 610 m || 
|-id=551 bgcolor=#fefefe
| 617551 ||  || — || August 29, 2005 || Kitt Peak || Spacewatch ||  || align=right data-sort-value="0.75" | 750 m || 
|-id=552 bgcolor=#fefefe
| 617552 ||  || — || August 31, 2005 || Palomar || NEAT ||  || align=right data-sort-value="0.70" | 700 m || 
|-id=553 bgcolor=#fefefe
| 617553 ||  || — || September 21, 2005 || Uccle || T. Pauwels ||  || align=right data-sort-value="0.83" | 830 m || 
|-id=554 bgcolor=#fefefe
| 617554 ||  || — || August 31, 2005 || Palomar || NEAT ||  || align=right data-sort-value="0.74" | 740 m || 
|-id=555 bgcolor=#fefefe
| 617555 ||  || — || September 30, 2005 || Mount Lemmon || Mount Lemmon Survey ||  || align=right data-sort-value="0.43" | 430 m || 
|-id=556 bgcolor=#fefefe
| 617556 ||  || — || September 13, 2005 || Catalina || CSS ||  || align=right data-sort-value="0.75" | 750 m || 
|-id=557 bgcolor=#fefefe
| 617557 ||  || — || September 30, 2005 || Kitt Peak || Spacewatch ||  || align=right data-sort-value="0.52" | 520 m || 
|-id=558 bgcolor=#E9E9E9
| 617558 ||  || — || September 30, 2005 || Kitt Peak || Spacewatch ||  || align=right | 1.1 km || 
|-id=559 bgcolor=#fefefe
| 617559 ||  || — || September 14, 2005 || Kitt Peak || Spacewatch ||  || align=right data-sort-value="0.71" | 710 m || 
|-id=560 bgcolor=#E9E9E9
| 617560 ||  || — || September 29, 2005 || Kitt Peak || Spacewatch ||  || align=right | 1.8 km || 
|-id=561 bgcolor=#E9E9E9
| 617561 ||  || — || September 4, 2000 || Kitt Peak || Spacewatch ||  || align=right | 1.5 km || 
|-id=562 bgcolor=#E9E9E9
| 617562 ||  || — || August 28, 2005 || Kitt Peak || Spacewatch ||  || align=right | 1.1 km || 
|-id=563 bgcolor=#fefefe
| 617563 ||  || — || September 30, 2005 || Kitt Peak || Spacewatch ||  || align=right data-sort-value="0.69" | 690 m || 
|-id=564 bgcolor=#fefefe
| 617564 ||  || — || September 30, 2005 || Mount Lemmon || Mount Lemmon Survey ||  || align=right data-sort-value="0.74" | 740 m || 
|-id=565 bgcolor=#fefefe
| 617565 ||  || — || August 26, 2005 || Palomar || NEAT ||  || align=right data-sort-value="0.69" | 690 m || 
|-id=566 bgcolor=#E9E9E9
| 617566 ||  || — || August 31, 2005 || Kitt Peak || Spacewatch ||  || align=right | 1.4 km || 
|-id=567 bgcolor=#E9E9E9
| 617567 ||  || — || September 23, 2005 || Kitt Peak || Spacewatch ||  || align=right | 2.0 km || 
|-id=568 bgcolor=#fefefe
| 617568 ||  || — || September 25, 2005 || Kitt Peak || Spacewatch ||  || align=right data-sort-value="0.53" | 530 m || 
|-id=569 bgcolor=#E9E9E9
| 617569 ||  || — || October 1, 2005 || Apache Point || SDSS Collaboration ||  || align=right data-sort-value="0.87" | 870 m || 
|-id=570 bgcolor=#fefefe
| 617570 ||  || — || September 24, 2005 || Kitt Peak || Spacewatch ||  || align=right data-sort-value="0.67" | 670 m || 
|-id=571 bgcolor=#d6d6d6
| 617571 ||  || — || September 14, 2017 || Haleakala || Pan-STARRS || Tj (2.99) || align=right | 3.2 km || 
|-id=572 bgcolor=#d6d6d6
| 617572 ||  || — || August 31, 2011 || Haleakala || Pan-STARRS ||  || align=right | 2.8 km || 
|-id=573 bgcolor=#fefefe
| 617573 ||  || — || September 26, 2005 || Kitt Peak || Spacewatch ||  || align=right data-sort-value="0.52" | 520 m || 
|-id=574 bgcolor=#fefefe
| 617574 ||  || — || September 2, 2005 || Palomar || NEAT ||  || align=right data-sort-value="0.97" | 970 m || 
|-id=575 bgcolor=#fefefe
| 617575 ||  || — || August 27, 2005 || Palomar || NEAT ||  || align=right data-sort-value="0.72" | 720 m || 
|-id=576 bgcolor=#fefefe
| 617576 ||  || — || October 1, 2005 || Mount Lemmon || Mount Lemmon Survey ||  || align=right data-sort-value="0.49" | 490 m || 
|-id=577 bgcolor=#d6d6d6
| 617577 ||  || — || September 25, 2005 || Palomar || NEAT ||  || align=right | 5.2 km || 
|-id=578 bgcolor=#fefefe
| 617578 ||  || — || October 1, 2005 || Kitt Peak || Spacewatch ||  || align=right data-sort-value="0.58" | 580 m || 
|-id=579 bgcolor=#E9E9E9
| 617579 ||  || — || August 30, 2005 || Palomar || NEAT ||  || align=right | 2.1 km || 
|-id=580 bgcolor=#E9E9E9
| 617580 ||  || — || October 3, 2005 || Kitt Peak || Spacewatch ||  || align=right | 1.7 km || 
|-id=581 bgcolor=#E9E9E9
| 617581 ||  || — || October 3, 2005 || Kitt Peak || Spacewatch ||  || align=right | 1.8 km || 
|-id=582 bgcolor=#E9E9E9
| 617582 ||  || — || October 3, 2005 || Kitt Peak || Spacewatch ||  || align=right | 1.2 km || 
|-id=583 bgcolor=#E9E9E9
| 617583 ||  || — || October 6, 2005 || Kitt Peak || Spacewatch ||  || align=right | 1.8 km || 
|-id=584 bgcolor=#fefefe
| 617584 ||  || — || October 6, 2005 || Mount Lemmon || Mount Lemmon Survey ||  || align=right data-sort-value="0.68" | 680 m || 
|-id=585 bgcolor=#fefefe
| 617585 ||  || — || September 25, 2005 || Kitt Peak || Spacewatch ||  || align=right data-sort-value="0.44" | 440 m || 
|-id=586 bgcolor=#fefefe
| 617586 ||  || — || September 29, 2005 || Kitt Peak || Spacewatch ||  || align=right data-sort-value="0.53" | 530 m || 
|-id=587 bgcolor=#E9E9E9
| 617587 ||  || — || October 4, 2005 || Mount Lemmon || Mount Lemmon Survey ||  || align=right data-sort-value="0.97" | 970 m || 
|-id=588 bgcolor=#E9E9E9
| 617588 ||  || — || October 7, 2005 || Kitt Peak || Spacewatch ||  || align=right | 1.2 km || 
|-id=589 bgcolor=#E9E9E9
| 617589 ||  || — || October 7, 2005 || Catalina || CSS ||  || align=right | 1.6 km || 
|-id=590 bgcolor=#fefefe
| 617590 ||  || — || September 29, 2005 || Kitt Peak || Spacewatch ||  || align=right data-sort-value="0.57" | 570 m || 
|-id=591 bgcolor=#E9E9E9
| 617591 ||  || — || October 8, 2005 || Kitt Peak || Spacewatch ||  || align=right | 1.5 km || 
|-id=592 bgcolor=#E9E9E9
| 617592 ||  || — || October 8, 2005 || Kitt Peak || Spacewatch ||  || align=right | 1.5 km || 
|-id=593 bgcolor=#fefefe
| 617593 ||  || — || October 8, 2005 || Kitt Peak || Spacewatch ||  || align=right data-sort-value="0.61" | 610 m || 
|-id=594 bgcolor=#fefefe
| 617594 ||  || — || October 9, 2005 || Kitt Peak || Spacewatch ||  || align=right data-sort-value="0.65" | 650 m || 
|-id=595 bgcolor=#fefefe
| 617595 ||  || — || October 9, 2005 || Kitt Peak || Spacewatch ||  || align=right data-sort-value="0.66" | 660 m || 
|-id=596 bgcolor=#E9E9E9
| 617596 ||  || — || October 9, 2005 || Kitt Peak || Spacewatch ||  || align=right | 1.8 km || 
|-id=597 bgcolor=#E9E9E9
| 617597 ||  || — || October 1, 2005 || Catalina || CSS ||  || align=right | 1.7 km || 
|-id=598 bgcolor=#E9E9E9
| 617598 ||  || — || October 1, 2005 || Mount Lemmon || Mount Lemmon Survey ||  || align=right | 1.7 km || 
|-id=599 bgcolor=#E9E9E9
| 617599 ||  || — || October 1, 2005 || Kitt Peak || Spacewatch ||  || align=right | 1.1 km || 
|-id=600 bgcolor=#E9E9E9
| 617600 ||  || — || October 1, 2005 || Mount Lemmon || Mount Lemmon Survey ||  || align=right | 1.5 km || 
|}

617601–617700 

|-bgcolor=#E9E9E9
| 617601 ||  || — || October 1, 2005 || Kitt Peak || Spacewatch ||  || align=right | 1.8 km || 
|-id=602 bgcolor=#E9E9E9
| 617602 ||  || — || October 1, 2005 || Kitt Peak || Spacewatch ||  || align=right | 2.0 km || 
|-id=603 bgcolor=#E9E9E9
| 617603 ||  || — || March 13, 2012 || Mount Lemmon || Mount Lemmon Survey ||  || align=right | 1.8 km || 
|-id=604 bgcolor=#fefefe
| 617604 ||  || — || October 9, 2005 || Kitt Peak || Spacewatch ||  || align=right data-sort-value="0.55" | 550 m || 
|-id=605 bgcolor=#fefefe
| 617605 ||  || — || December 11, 2012 || Mount Lemmon || Mount Lemmon Survey ||  || align=right data-sort-value="0.73" | 730 m || 
|-id=606 bgcolor=#E9E9E9
| 617606 ||  || — || October 12, 2005 || Kitt Peak || Spacewatch ||  || align=right | 1.7 km || 
|-id=607 bgcolor=#fefefe
| 617607 ||  || — || June 26, 2015 || Haleakala || Pan-STARRS ||  || align=right data-sort-value="0.55" | 550 m || 
|-id=608 bgcolor=#E9E9E9
| 617608 ||  || — || August 29, 2014 || Mount Lemmon || Mount Lemmon Survey ||  || align=right | 2.2 km || 
|-id=609 bgcolor=#E9E9E9
| 617609 ||  || — || November 11, 2010 || Mount Lemmon || Mount Lemmon Survey ||  || align=right | 1.5 km || 
|-id=610 bgcolor=#fefefe
| 617610 ||  || — || October 1, 2005 || Mount Lemmon || Mount Lemmon Survey ||  || align=right data-sort-value="0.83" | 830 m || 
|-id=611 bgcolor=#E9E9E9
| 617611 ||  || — || October 9, 2005 || Kitt Peak || Spacewatch ||  || align=right | 1.8 km || 
|-id=612 bgcolor=#d6d6d6
| 617612 ||  || — || September 29, 2011 || Kitt Peak || Spacewatch ||  || align=right | 2.1 km || 
|-id=613 bgcolor=#E9E9E9
| 617613 ||  || — || October 12, 2005 || Kitt Peak || Spacewatch ||  || align=right | 1.7 km || 
|-id=614 bgcolor=#E9E9E9
| 617614 ||  || — || November 13, 2010 || Mount Lemmon || Mount Lemmon Survey ||  || align=right | 1.8 km || 
|-id=615 bgcolor=#E9E9E9
| 617615 ||  || — || September 27, 2014 || Mount Lemmon || Mount Lemmon Survey ||  || align=right | 1.6 km || 
|-id=616 bgcolor=#fefefe
| 617616 ||  || — || October 7, 2005 || Mauna Kea || Mauna Kea Obs. ||  || align=right data-sort-value="0.81" | 810 m || 
|-id=617 bgcolor=#E9E9E9
| 617617 ||  || — || October 2, 2005 || Mount Lemmon || Mount Lemmon Survey ||  || align=right | 1.6 km || 
|-id=618 bgcolor=#E9E9E9
| 617618 ||  || — || October 7, 2005 || Kitt Peak || Spacewatch ||  || align=right | 1.5 km || 
|-id=619 bgcolor=#E9E9E9
| 617619 ||  || — || October 26, 2005 || Mount Graham || W. H. Ryan ||  || align=right | 1.9 km || 
|-id=620 bgcolor=#E9E9E9
| 617620 ||  || — || August 31, 2005 || Palomar || NEAT ||  || align=right | 2.7 km || 
|-id=621 bgcolor=#E9E9E9
| 617621 ||  || — || October 1, 2005 || Mount Lemmon || Mount Lemmon Survey ||  || align=right | 1.8 km || 
|-id=622 bgcolor=#fefefe
| 617622 ||  || — || October 24, 2005 || Kitt Peak || Spacewatch ||  || align=right data-sort-value="0.54" | 540 m || 
|-id=623 bgcolor=#fefefe
| 617623 ||  || — || October 24, 2005 || Kitt Peak || Spacewatch ||  || align=right data-sort-value="0.62" | 620 m || 
|-id=624 bgcolor=#fefefe
| 617624 ||  || — || October 1, 2005 || Kitt Peak || Spacewatch ||  || align=right data-sort-value="0.63" | 630 m || 
|-id=625 bgcolor=#E9E9E9
| 617625 ||  || — || October 25, 2005 || Mount Lemmon || Mount Lemmon Survey ||  || align=right | 1.7 km || 
|-id=626 bgcolor=#E9E9E9
| 617626 ||  || — || October 25, 2005 || Catalina || CSS ||  || align=right | 1.4 km || 
|-id=627 bgcolor=#FA8072
| 617627 ||  || — || October 25, 2005 || Kitt Peak || Spacewatch ||  || align=right data-sort-value="0.65" | 650 m || 
|-id=628 bgcolor=#E9E9E9
| 617628 ||  || — || October 11, 2005 || Kitt Peak || Spacewatch ||  || align=right | 1.7 km || 
|-id=629 bgcolor=#fefefe
| 617629 ||  || — || October 1, 2005 || Mount Lemmon || Mount Lemmon Survey ||  || align=right data-sort-value="0.59" | 590 m || 
|-id=630 bgcolor=#E9E9E9
| 617630 ||  || — || October 24, 2005 || Palomar || NEAT ||  || align=right | 1.7 km || 
|-id=631 bgcolor=#E9E9E9
| 617631 ||  || — || October 25, 2005 || Kitt Peak || Spacewatch ||  || align=right | 1.9 km || 
|-id=632 bgcolor=#E9E9E9
| 617632 ||  || — || October 26, 2005 || Kitt Peak || Spacewatch ||  || align=right | 1.8 km || 
|-id=633 bgcolor=#fefefe
| 617633 ||  || — || October 26, 2005 || Kitt Peak || Spacewatch ||  || align=right data-sort-value="0.70" | 700 m || 
|-id=634 bgcolor=#E9E9E9
| 617634 ||  || — || October 27, 2005 || Anderson Mesa || LONEOS ||  || align=right | 1.4 km || 
|-id=635 bgcolor=#E9E9E9
| 617635 ||  || — || October 13, 2005 || Kitt Peak || Spacewatch ||  || align=right | 1.8 km || 
|-id=636 bgcolor=#fefefe
| 617636 ||  || — || October 27, 2005 || Mount Lemmon || Mount Lemmon Survey ||  || align=right data-sort-value="0.62" | 620 m || 
|-id=637 bgcolor=#E9E9E9
| 617637 ||  || — || October 25, 2005 || Kitt Peak || Spacewatch ||  || align=right | 1.8 km || 
|-id=638 bgcolor=#E9E9E9
| 617638 ||  || — || October 25, 2005 || Mount Lemmon || Mount Lemmon Survey ||  || align=right | 2.0 km || 
|-id=639 bgcolor=#E9E9E9
| 617639 ||  || — || October 27, 2005 || Kitt Peak || Spacewatch ||  || align=right | 1.6 km || 
|-id=640 bgcolor=#fefefe
| 617640 ||  || — || October 27, 2005 || Kitt Peak || Spacewatch ||  || align=right data-sort-value="0.67" | 670 m || 
|-id=641 bgcolor=#fefefe
| 617641 ||  || — || October 27, 2005 || Kitt Peak || Spacewatch ||  || align=right data-sort-value="0.50" | 500 m || 
|-id=642 bgcolor=#E9E9E9
| 617642 ||  || — || October 25, 2005 || Kitt Peak || Spacewatch ||  || align=right | 1.8 km || 
|-id=643 bgcolor=#E9E9E9
| 617643 ||  || — || October 25, 2005 || Kitt Peak || Spacewatch ||  || align=right | 1.8 km || 
|-id=644 bgcolor=#fefefe
| 617644 ||  || — || October 25, 2005 || Kitt Peak || Spacewatch ||  || align=right data-sort-value="0.72" | 720 m || 
|-id=645 bgcolor=#E9E9E9
| 617645 ||  || — || September 29, 2005 || Mount Lemmon || Mount Lemmon Survey ||  || align=right | 1.4 km || 
|-id=646 bgcolor=#E9E9E9
| 617646 ||  || — || October 28, 2005 || Kitt Peak || Spacewatch ||  || align=right | 1.6 km || 
|-id=647 bgcolor=#E9E9E9
| 617647 ||  || — || October 24, 2005 || Kitt Peak || Spacewatch ||  || align=right | 2.1 km || 
|-id=648 bgcolor=#E9E9E9
| 617648 ||  || — || October 24, 2005 || Kitt Peak || Spacewatch ||  || align=right | 1.8 km || 
|-id=649 bgcolor=#E9E9E9
| 617649 ||  || — || October 25, 2005 || Mount Lemmon || Mount Lemmon Survey ||  || align=right | 1.8 km || 
|-id=650 bgcolor=#fefefe
| 617650 ||  || — || September 25, 2005 || Kitt Peak || Spacewatch ||  || align=right data-sort-value="0.61" | 610 m || 
|-id=651 bgcolor=#fefefe
| 617651 ||  || — || October 26, 2005 || Kitt Peak || Spacewatch ||  || align=right | 1.0 km || 
|-id=652 bgcolor=#fefefe
| 617652 ||  || — || October 26, 2005 || Kitt Peak || Spacewatch ||  || align=right data-sort-value="0.73" | 730 m || 
|-id=653 bgcolor=#E9E9E9
| 617653 ||  || — || October 27, 2005 || Mount Lemmon || Mount Lemmon Survey ||  || align=right | 1.0 km || 
|-id=654 bgcolor=#fefefe
| 617654 ||  || — || October 27, 2005 || Kitt Peak || Spacewatch ||  || align=right data-sort-value="0.60" | 600 m || 
|-id=655 bgcolor=#fefefe
| 617655 ||  || — || October 28, 2005 || Kitt Peak || Spacewatch ||  || align=right data-sort-value="0.50" | 500 m || 
|-id=656 bgcolor=#E9E9E9
| 617656 ||  || — || March 23, 2003 || Kitt Peak || Spacewatch ||  || align=right | 1.7 km || 
|-id=657 bgcolor=#fefefe
| 617657 ||  || — || September 14, 2005 || Catalina || CSS ||  || align=right data-sort-value="0.77" | 770 m || 
|-id=658 bgcolor=#fefefe
| 617658 ||  || — || October 22, 2005 || Kitt Peak || Spacewatch ||  || align=right data-sort-value="0.71" | 710 m || 
|-id=659 bgcolor=#fefefe
| 617659 ||  || — || October 22, 2005 || Kitt Peak || Spacewatch ||  || align=right data-sort-value="0.79" | 790 m || 
|-id=660 bgcolor=#d6d6d6
| 617660 ||  || — || October 31, 2005 || Mount Lemmon || Mount Lemmon Survey || 7:4 || align=right | 2.9 km || 
|-id=661 bgcolor=#fefefe
| 617661 ||  || — || May 23, 2001 || Cerro Tololo || J. L. Elliot, L. H. Wasserman ||  || align=right data-sort-value="0.67" | 670 m || 
|-id=662 bgcolor=#E9E9E9
| 617662 ||  || — || October 22, 2005 || Kitt Peak || Spacewatch ||  || align=right | 1.0 km || 
|-id=663 bgcolor=#E9E9E9
| 617663 ||  || — || October 27, 2005 || Kitt Peak || Spacewatch ||  || align=right | 1.9 km || 
|-id=664 bgcolor=#E9E9E9
| 617664 ||  || — || October 22, 2005 || Kitt Peak || Spacewatch ||  || align=right | 2.0 km || 
|-id=665 bgcolor=#E9E9E9
| 617665 ||  || — || October 11, 2005 || Kitt Peak || Spacewatch ||  || align=right | 1.9 km || 
|-id=666 bgcolor=#E9E9E9
| 617666 ||  || — || October 29, 2005 || Mount Lemmon || Mount Lemmon Survey ||  || align=right | 1.8 km || 
|-id=667 bgcolor=#E9E9E9
| 617667 ||  || — || October 28, 2005 || Catalina || CSS ||  || align=right | 2.0 km || 
|-id=668 bgcolor=#E9E9E9
| 617668 ||  || — || September 27, 2005 || Kitt Peak || Spacewatch ||  || align=right | 2.0 km || 
|-id=669 bgcolor=#E9E9E9
| 617669 ||  || — || October 30, 2005 || Mount Lemmon || Mount Lemmon Survey ||  || align=right | 1.7 km || 
|-id=670 bgcolor=#fefefe
| 617670 ||  || — || October 26, 2005 || Kitt Peak || Spacewatch ||  || align=right data-sort-value="0.55" | 550 m || 
|-id=671 bgcolor=#E9E9E9
| 617671 ||  || — || October 11, 2005 || Kitt Peak || Spacewatch ||  || align=right | 1.6 km || 
|-id=672 bgcolor=#E9E9E9
| 617672 ||  || — || October 31, 2005 || Mount Lemmon || Mount Lemmon Survey ||  || align=right | 1.9 km || 
|-id=673 bgcolor=#fefefe
| 617673 ||  || — || October 25, 2005 || Kitt Peak || Spacewatch ||  || align=right data-sort-value="0.55" | 550 m || 
|-id=674 bgcolor=#E9E9E9
| 617674 ||  || — || October 25, 2005 || Kitt Peak || Spacewatch ||  || align=right | 1.7 km || 
|-id=675 bgcolor=#fefefe
| 617675 ||  || — || October 25, 2005 || Kitt Peak || Spacewatch ||  || align=right data-sort-value="0.66" | 660 m || 
|-id=676 bgcolor=#fefefe
| 617676 ||  || — || October 27, 2005 || Mount Lemmon || Mount Lemmon Survey ||  || align=right data-sort-value="0.63" | 630 m || 
|-id=677 bgcolor=#fefefe
| 617677 ||  || — || October 27, 2005 || Mount Lemmon || Mount Lemmon Survey ||  || align=right data-sort-value="0.57" | 570 m || 
|-id=678 bgcolor=#E9E9E9
| 617678 ||  || — || October 28, 2005 || Kitt Peak || Spacewatch ||  || align=right | 1.9 km || 
|-id=679 bgcolor=#fefefe
| 617679 ||  || — || October 28, 2005 || Kitt Peak || Spacewatch ||  || align=right data-sort-value="0.93" | 930 m || 
|-id=680 bgcolor=#E9E9E9
| 617680 ||  || — || October 29, 2005 || Kitt Peak || Spacewatch ||  || align=right | 1.9 km || 
|-id=681 bgcolor=#E9E9E9
| 617681 ||  || — || October 30, 2005 || Kitt Peak || Spacewatch ||  || align=right | 1.8 km || 
|-id=682 bgcolor=#fefefe
| 617682 ||  || — || October 30, 2005 || Kitt Peak || Spacewatch ||  || align=right data-sort-value="0.76" | 760 m || 
|-id=683 bgcolor=#fefefe
| 617683 ||  || — || October 22, 2005 || Kitt Peak || Spacewatch ||  || align=right data-sort-value="0.74" | 740 m || 
|-id=684 bgcolor=#E9E9E9
| 617684 ||  || — || September 1, 2005 || Palomar || NEAT ||  || align=right | 1.5 km || 
|-id=685 bgcolor=#fefefe
| 617685 ||  || — || October 23, 2005 || Catalina || CSS ||  || align=right data-sort-value="0.70" | 700 m || 
|-id=686 bgcolor=#E9E9E9
| 617686 ||  || — || October 27, 2005 || Socorro || LINEAR ||  || align=right | 2.0 km || 
|-id=687 bgcolor=#d6d6d6
| 617687 ||  || — || October 27, 2005 || Apache Point || SDSS Collaboration || 7:4 || align=right | 2.4 km || 
|-id=688 bgcolor=#fefefe
| 617688 ||  || — || October 25, 2005 || Apache Point || SDSS Collaboration ||  || align=right data-sort-value="0.55" | 550 m || 
|-id=689 bgcolor=#d6d6d6
| 617689 ||  || — || December 1, 2005 || Mount Lemmon || Mount Lemmon Survey ||  || align=right | 2.4 km || 
|-id=690 bgcolor=#fefefe
| 617690 ||  || — || September 25, 2005 || Kitt Peak || Spacewatch ||  || align=right data-sort-value="0.66" | 660 m || 
|-id=691 bgcolor=#E9E9E9
| 617691 ||  || — || October 24, 2005 || Palomar || NEAT ||  || align=right | 2.2 km || 
|-id=692 bgcolor=#fefefe
| 617692 ||  || — || October 29, 2005 || Kitt Peak || Spacewatch ||  || align=right data-sort-value="0.73" | 730 m || 
|-id=693 bgcolor=#C2FFFF
| 617693 ||  || — || October 31, 2005 || Mauna Kea || Mauna Kea Obs. || L5 || align=right | 7.3 km || 
|-id=694 bgcolor=#E9E9E9
| 617694 ||  || — || October 22, 2005 || Kitt Peak || Spacewatch ||  || align=right | 1.8 km || 
|-id=695 bgcolor=#E9E9E9
| 617695 ||  || — || October 28, 2005 || Mount Lemmon || Mount Lemmon Survey ||  || align=right | 1.9 km || 
|-id=696 bgcolor=#E9E9E9
| 617696 ||  || — || August 10, 2009 || Kitt Peak || Spacewatch ||  || align=right | 1.1 km || 
|-id=697 bgcolor=#fefefe
| 617697 ||  || — || October 18, 2012 || Haleakala || Pan-STARRS ||  || align=right data-sort-value="0.58" | 580 m || 
|-id=698 bgcolor=#fefefe
| 617698 ||  || — || October 27, 2016 || Mount Lemmon || Mount Lemmon Survey ||  || align=right data-sort-value="0.67" | 670 m || 
|-id=699 bgcolor=#E9E9E9
| 617699 ||  || — || October 24, 2005 || Kitt Peak || Spacewatch ||  || align=right | 1.9 km || 
|-id=700 bgcolor=#fefefe
| 617700 ||  || — || October 10, 2016 || Mount Lemmon || Mount Lemmon Survey ||  || align=right data-sort-value="0.73" | 730 m || 
|}

617701–617800 

|-bgcolor=#E9E9E9
| 617701 ||  || — || April 4, 2017 || Haleakala || Pan-STARRS ||  || align=right | 1.9 km || 
|-id=702 bgcolor=#E9E9E9
| 617702 ||  || — || October 3, 2014 || Mauna Kea || D. J. Tholen ||  || align=right | 1.7 km || 
|-id=703 bgcolor=#E9E9E9
| 617703 ||  || — || September 2, 2014 || Haleakala || Pan-STARRS ||  || align=right | 1.7 km || 
|-id=704 bgcolor=#E9E9E9
| 617704 ||  || — || October 29, 2005 || Mount Lemmon || Mount Lemmon Survey ||  || align=right | 1.8 km || 
|-id=705 bgcolor=#E9E9E9
| 617705 ||  || — || October 24, 2005 || Kitt Peak || Spacewatch ||  || align=right | 1.6 km || 
|-id=706 bgcolor=#E9E9E9
| 617706 ||  || — || October 31, 2005 || Kitt Peak || Spacewatch ||  || align=right | 1.7 km || 
|-id=707 bgcolor=#C2FFFF
| 617707 ||  || — || October 24, 2005 || Mauna Kea || Mauna Kea Obs. || L5 || align=right | 7.8 km || 
|-id=708 bgcolor=#fefefe
| 617708 ||  || — || October 22, 2005 || Kitt Peak || Spacewatch ||  || align=right data-sort-value="0.69" | 690 m || 
|-id=709 bgcolor=#E9E9E9
| 617709 ||  || — || October 24, 2005 || Kitt Peak || Spacewatch ||  || align=right | 1.00 km || 
|-id=710 bgcolor=#fefefe
| 617710 ||  || — || October 28, 2005 || Mount Lemmon || Mount Lemmon Survey ||  || align=right data-sort-value="0.60" | 600 m || 
|-id=711 bgcolor=#E9E9E9
| 617711 ||  || — || October 27, 2005 || Kitt Peak || Spacewatch ||  || align=right | 2.2 km || 
|-id=712 bgcolor=#fefefe
| 617712 ||  || — || November 2, 2005 || Mount Lemmon || Mount Lemmon Survey ||  || align=right data-sort-value="0.72" | 720 m || 
|-id=713 bgcolor=#fefefe
| 617713 ||  || — || October 25, 2005 || Kitt Peak || Spacewatch ||  || align=right data-sort-value="0.78" | 780 m || 
|-id=714 bgcolor=#fefefe
| 617714 ||  || — || October 28, 2005 || Catalina || CSS ||  || align=right data-sort-value="0.68" | 680 m || 
|-id=715 bgcolor=#fefefe
| 617715 ||  || — || October 22, 2005 || Catalina || CSS ||  || align=right data-sort-value="0.68" | 680 m || 
|-id=716 bgcolor=#E9E9E9
| 617716 ||  || — || October 29, 2005 || Kitt Peak || Spacewatch ||  || align=right | 1.6 km || 
|-id=717 bgcolor=#fefefe
| 617717 ||  || — || October 14, 2001 || Kitt Peak || Spacewatch ||  || align=right data-sort-value="0.68" | 680 m || 
|-id=718 bgcolor=#E9E9E9
| 617718 ||  || — || November 3, 2005 || Mount Lemmon || Mount Lemmon Survey ||  || align=right | 1.6 km || 
|-id=719 bgcolor=#E9E9E9
| 617719 ||  || — || November 6, 2005 || Kitt Peak || Spacewatch ||  || align=right | 2.2 km || 
|-id=720 bgcolor=#E9E9E9
| 617720 ||  || — || November 4, 2005 || Kitt Peak || Spacewatch ||  || align=right | 2.5 km || 
|-id=721 bgcolor=#fefefe
| 617721 ||  || — || October 25, 2005 || Kitt Peak || Spacewatch ||  || align=right data-sort-value="0.66" | 660 m || 
|-id=722 bgcolor=#E9E9E9
| 617722 ||  || — || October 23, 2005 || Kitt Peak || Spacewatch ||  || align=right | 1.1 km || 
|-id=723 bgcolor=#E9E9E9
| 617723 ||  || — || October 25, 2005 || Mount Lemmon || Mount Lemmon Survey ||  || align=right | 2.2 km || 
|-id=724 bgcolor=#fefefe
| 617724 ||  || — || October 29, 2005 || Kitt Peak || Spacewatch ||  || align=right data-sort-value="0.64" | 640 m || 
|-id=725 bgcolor=#E9E9E9
| 617725 ||  || — || November 11, 2005 || Kitt Peak || Spacewatch ||  || align=right | 1.9 km || 
|-id=726 bgcolor=#fefefe
| 617726 ||  || — || November 5, 2005 || Catalina || CSS ||  || align=right | 1.3 km || 
|-id=727 bgcolor=#d6d6d6
| 617727 ||  || — || December 21, 2006 || Kitt Peak || Spacewatch || 7:4 || align=right | 2.4 km || 
|-id=728 bgcolor=#E9E9E9
| 617728 ||  || — || October 1, 2005 || Apache Point || SDSS Collaboration ||  || align=right data-sort-value="0.86" | 860 m || 
|-id=729 bgcolor=#E9E9E9
| 617729 ||  || — || July 23, 2009 || Siding Spring || SSS ||  || align=right | 2.0 km || 
|-id=730 bgcolor=#fefefe
| 617730 ||  || — || November 1, 2005 || Kitt Peak || Spacewatch ||  || align=right data-sort-value="0.80" | 800 m || 
|-id=731 bgcolor=#E9E9E9
| 617731 ||  || — || May 17, 2013 || Mount Lemmon || Mount Lemmon Survey ||  || align=right | 1.9 km || 
|-id=732 bgcolor=#E9E9E9
| 617732 ||  || — || December 14, 2010 || Mount Lemmon || Mount Lemmon Survey ||  || align=right | 1.8 km || 
|-id=733 bgcolor=#fefefe
| 617733 ||  || — || April 13, 2011 || Haleakala || Pan-STARRS ||  || align=right data-sort-value="0.68" | 680 m || 
|-id=734 bgcolor=#fefefe
| 617734 ||  || — || October 15, 2012 || Haleakala || Pan-STARRS ||  || align=right data-sort-value="0.66" | 660 m || 
|-id=735 bgcolor=#E9E9E9
| 617735 ||  || — || November 5, 2005 || Kitt Peak || Spacewatch ||  || align=right | 1.7 km || 
|-id=736 bgcolor=#E9E9E9
| 617736 ||  || — || October 29, 2014 || Kitt Peak || Spacewatch ||  || align=right | 1.8 km || 
|-id=737 bgcolor=#E9E9E9
| 617737 ||  || — || September 29, 2014 || Haleakala || Pan-STARRS ||  || align=right | 1.7 km || 
|-id=738 bgcolor=#fefefe
| 617738 ||  || — || November 20, 2005 || Catalina || CSS ||  || align=right | 1.3 km || 
|-id=739 bgcolor=#E9E9E9
| 617739 ||  || — || October 28, 2005 || Mount Lemmon || Mount Lemmon Survey ||  || align=right | 1.7 km || 
|-id=740 bgcolor=#fefefe
| 617740 ||  || — || November 22, 2005 || Kitt Peak || Spacewatch ||  || align=right data-sort-value="0.91" | 910 m || 
|-id=741 bgcolor=#fefefe
| 617741 ||  || — || October 1, 2005 || Mount Lemmon || Mount Lemmon Survey ||  || align=right data-sort-value="0.64" | 640 m || 
|-id=742 bgcolor=#E9E9E9
| 617742 ||  || — || November 25, 2005 || Kitt Peak || Spacewatch ||  || align=right | 2.0 km || 
|-id=743 bgcolor=#fefefe
| 617743 ||  || — || October 25, 2005 || Mount Lemmon || Mount Lemmon Survey ||  || align=right data-sort-value="0.62" | 620 m || 
|-id=744 bgcolor=#E9E9E9
| 617744 ||  || — || November 25, 2005 || Kitt Peak || Spacewatch ||  || align=right | 1.4 km || 
|-id=745 bgcolor=#fefefe
| 617745 ||  || — || November 30, 2005 || Socorro || LINEAR ||  || align=right | 1.1 km || 
|-id=746 bgcolor=#fefefe
| 617746 ||  || — || October 28, 2005 || Kitt Peak || Spacewatch ||  || align=right data-sort-value="0.68" | 680 m || 
|-id=747 bgcolor=#fefefe
| 617747 ||  || — || November 26, 2005 || Kitt Peak || Spacewatch ||  || align=right data-sort-value="0.66" | 660 m || 
|-id=748 bgcolor=#E9E9E9
| 617748 ||  || — || November 30, 2005 || Kitt Peak || Spacewatch ||  || align=right | 2.1 km || 
|-id=749 bgcolor=#fefefe
| 617749 ||  || — || October 31, 2005 || Mount Lemmon || Mount Lemmon Survey ||  || align=right data-sort-value="0.63" | 630 m || 
|-id=750 bgcolor=#E9E9E9
| 617750 ||  || — || November 25, 2005 || Mount Lemmon || Mount Lemmon Survey ||  || align=right | 1.7 km || 
|-id=751 bgcolor=#E9E9E9
| 617751 ||  || — || October 25, 2005 || Mount Lemmon || Mount Lemmon Survey ||  || align=right | 1.5 km || 
|-id=752 bgcolor=#fefefe
| 617752 ||  || — || November 25, 2005 || Mount Lemmon || Mount Lemmon Survey ||  || align=right data-sort-value="0.66" | 660 m || 
|-id=753 bgcolor=#E9E9E9
| 617753 ||  || — || November 26, 2005 || Mount Lemmon || Mount Lemmon Survey ||  || align=right | 2.1 km || 
|-id=754 bgcolor=#E9E9E9
| 617754 ||  || — || November 25, 2005 || Mount Lemmon || Mount Lemmon Survey ||  || align=right | 1.8 km || 
|-id=755 bgcolor=#E9E9E9
| 617755 ||  || — || November 1, 2005 || Mount Lemmon || Mount Lemmon Survey ||  || align=right | 2.0 km || 
|-id=756 bgcolor=#FA8072
| 617756 ||  || — || October 28, 2005 || Socorro || LINEAR ||  || align=right data-sort-value="0.79" | 790 m || 
|-id=757 bgcolor=#E9E9E9
| 617757 ||  || — || November 30, 2005 || Kitt Peak || Spacewatch ||  || align=right | 1.7 km || 
|-id=758 bgcolor=#fefefe
| 617758 ||  || — || November 30, 2005 || Mount Lemmon || Mount Lemmon Survey ||  || align=right data-sort-value="0.51" | 510 m || 
|-id=759 bgcolor=#E9E9E9
| 617759 ||  || — || November 1, 2005 || Kitt Peak || Spacewatch ||  || align=right | 1.7 km || 
|-id=760 bgcolor=#fefefe
| 617760 ||  || — || November 30, 2005 || Kitt Peak || Spacewatch ||  || align=right data-sort-value="0.64" | 640 m || 
|-id=761 bgcolor=#E9E9E9
| 617761 ||  || — || October 1, 2014 || Haleakala || Pan-STARRS ||  || align=right | 1.9 km || 
|-id=762 bgcolor=#E9E9E9
| 617762 ||  || — || November 30, 2005 || Kitt Peak || Spacewatch ||  || align=right | 2.9 km || 
|-id=763 bgcolor=#fefefe
| 617763 ||  || — || November 4, 2005 || Kitt Peak || Spacewatch ||  || align=right data-sort-value="0.53" | 530 m || 
|-id=764 bgcolor=#E9E9E9
| 617764 ||  || — || October 29, 2005 || Kitt Peak || Spacewatch ||  || align=right | 2.0 km || 
|-id=765 bgcolor=#E9E9E9
| 617765 ||  || — || December 1, 2005 || Mount Lemmon || Mount Lemmon Survey ||  || align=right | 1.6 km || 
|-id=766 bgcolor=#fefefe
| 617766 ||  || — || October 29, 2005 || Mount Lemmon || Mount Lemmon Survey ||  || align=right data-sort-value="0.56" | 560 m || 
|-id=767 bgcolor=#fefefe
| 617767 ||  || — || November 26, 2005 || Mount Lemmon || Mount Lemmon Survey ||  || align=right data-sort-value="0.73" | 730 m || 
|-id=768 bgcolor=#fefefe
| 617768 ||  || — || December 1, 2005 || Mount Lemmon || Mount Lemmon Survey ||  || align=right data-sort-value="0.61" | 610 m || 
|-id=769 bgcolor=#fefefe
| 617769 ||  || — || December 2, 2005 || Kitt Peak || Spacewatch ||  || align=right data-sort-value="0.91" | 910 m || 
|-id=770 bgcolor=#fefefe
| 617770 ||  || — || December 2, 2005 || Kitt Peak || Spacewatch ||  || align=right data-sort-value="0.60" | 600 m || 
|-id=771 bgcolor=#fefefe
| 617771 ||  || — || December 6, 2005 || Kitt Peak || Spacewatch ||  || align=right data-sort-value="0.75" | 750 m || 
|-id=772 bgcolor=#E9E9E9
| 617772 ||  || — || December 6, 2005 || Kitt Peak || Spacewatch ||  || align=right | 1.7 km || 
|-id=773 bgcolor=#E9E9E9
| 617773 ||  || — || December 8, 2005 || Kitt Peak || Spacewatch ||  || align=right | 1.9 km || 
|-id=774 bgcolor=#E9E9E9
| 617774 ||  || — || December 8, 2005 || Kitt Peak || Spacewatch ||  || align=right | 2.5 km || 
|-id=775 bgcolor=#E9E9E9
| 617775 ||  || — || December 1, 2005 || Kitt Peak || L. H. Wasserman, R. Millis ||  || align=right | 1.7 km || 
|-id=776 bgcolor=#fefefe
| 617776 ||  || — || December 1, 2005 || Kitt Peak || L. H. Wasserman, R. Millis ||  || align=right data-sort-value="0.71" | 710 m || 
|-id=777 bgcolor=#C2FFFF
| 617777 ||  || — || December 1, 2005 || Kitt Peak || L. H. Wasserman, R. Millis || L5 || align=right | 6.0 km || 
|-id=778 bgcolor=#C2FFFF
| 617778 ||  || — || October 24, 2005 || Mauna Kea || Mauna Kea Obs. || L5 || align=right | 9.2 km || 
|-id=779 bgcolor=#E9E9E9
| 617779 ||  || — || December 1, 2005 || Mount Lemmon || Mount Lemmon Survey ||  || align=right | 1.8 km || 
|-id=780 bgcolor=#fefefe
| 617780 ||  || — || December 10, 2005 || Kitt Peak || Spacewatch ||  || align=right data-sort-value="0.72" | 720 m || 
|-id=781 bgcolor=#fefefe
| 617781 ||  || — || June 27, 2015 || Haleakala || Pan-STARRS ||  || align=right data-sort-value="0.64" | 640 m || 
|-id=782 bgcolor=#fefefe
| 617782 ||  || — || December 7, 2005 || Kitt Peak || Spacewatch ||  || align=right data-sort-value="0.67" | 670 m || 
|-id=783 bgcolor=#E9E9E9
| 617783 ||  || — || October 31, 2005 || Mount Lemmon || Mount Lemmon Survey ||  || align=right | 1.1 km || 
|-id=784 bgcolor=#d6d6d6
| 617784 ||  || — || March 7, 2017 || Haleakala || Pan-STARRS ||  || align=right | 1.8 km || 
|-id=785 bgcolor=#fefefe
| 617785 ||  || — || December 1, 2005 || Mount Lemmon || Mount Lemmon Survey ||  || align=right data-sort-value="0.72" | 720 m || 
|-id=786 bgcolor=#E9E9E9
| 617786 ||  || — || December 22, 2005 || Kitt Peak || Spacewatch ||  || align=right | 1.8 km || 
|-id=787 bgcolor=#d6d6d6
| 617787 ||  || — || December 25, 2005 || Kitt Peak || Spacewatch ||  || align=right | 1.8 km || 
|-id=788 bgcolor=#E9E9E9
| 617788 ||  || — || December 1, 2005 || Mount Lemmon || Mount Lemmon Survey ||  || align=right | 2.2 km || 
|-id=789 bgcolor=#d6d6d6
| 617789 ||  || — || December 24, 2005 || Kitt Peak || Spacewatch ||  || align=right | 1.7 km || 
|-id=790 bgcolor=#fefefe
| 617790 ||  || — || December 10, 2005 || Kitt Peak || Spacewatch ||  || align=right data-sort-value="0.97" | 970 m || 
|-id=791 bgcolor=#fefefe
| 617791 ||  || — || December 25, 2005 || Mount Lemmon || Mount Lemmon Survey ||  || align=right data-sort-value="0.92" | 920 m || 
|-id=792 bgcolor=#d6d6d6
| 617792 ||  || — || August 13, 2004 || Cerro Tololo || Cerro Tololo Obs. ||  || align=right | 2.0 km || 
|-id=793 bgcolor=#fefefe
| 617793 ||  || — || December 25, 2005 || Kitt Peak || Spacewatch ||  || align=right data-sort-value="0.52" | 520 m || 
|-id=794 bgcolor=#E9E9E9
| 617794 ||  || — || November 24, 2000 || Kitt Peak || Spacewatch ||  || align=right | 1.9 km || 
|-id=795 bgcolor=#FA8072
| 617795 ||  || — || December 25, 2005 || Mount Lemmon || Mount Lemmon Survey || H || align=right data-sort-value="0.45" | 450 m || 
|-id=796 bgcolor=#FA8072
| 617796 ||  || — || December 28, 2005 || Kitt Peak || Spacewatch || H || align=right data-sort-value="0.65" | 650 m || 
|-id=797 bgcolor=#fefefe
| 617797 ||  || — || December 26, 2005 || Kitt Peak || Spacewatch ||  || align=right data-sort-value="0.86" | 860 m || 
|-id=798 bgcolor=#E9E9E9
| 617798 ||  || — || December 29, 2005 || Kitt Peak || Spacewatch ||  || align=right | 1.8 km || 
|-id=799 bgcolor=#fefefe
| 617799 ||  || — || December 27, 2005 || Mount Lemmon || Mount Lemmon Survey ||  || align=right data-sort-value="0.61" | 610 m || 
|-id=800 bgcolor=#E9E9E9
| 617800 ||  || — || December 29, 2005 || Kitt Peak || Spacewatch ||  || align=right | 2.0 km || 
|}

617801–617900 

|-bgcolor=#d6d6d6
| 617801 ||  || — || December 31, 2005 || Kitt Peak || Spacewatch ||  || align=right | 1.8 km || 
|-id=802 bgcolor=#E9E9E9
| 617802 ||  || — || December 5, 2005 || Mount Lemmon || Mount Lemmon Survey ||  || align=right | 2.0 km || 
|-id=803 bgcolor=#fefefe
| 617803 ||  || — || December 31, 2005 || Kitt Peak || Spacewatch ||  || align=right data-sort-value="0.60" | 600 m || 
|-id=804 bgcolor=#E9E9E9
| 617804 ||  || — || December 25, 2005 || Kitt Peak || Spacewatch ||  || align=right | 2.5 km || 
|-id=805 bgcolor=#fefefe
| 617805 ||  || — || December 25, 2005 || Mount Lemmon || Mount Lemmon Survey ||  || align=right data-sort-value="0.96" | 960 m || 
|-id=806 bgcolor=#d6d6d6
| 617806 ||  || — || December 25, 2005 || Kitt Peak || Spacewatch ||  || align=right | 1.8 km || 
|-id=807 bgcolor=#fefefe
| 617807 ||  || — || December 26, 2005 || Kitt Peak || Spacewatch ||  || align=right data-sort-value="0.55" | 550 m || 
|-id=808 bgcolor=#fefefe
| 617808 ||  || — || December 25, 2005 || Kitt Peak || Spacewatch ||  || align=right data-sort-value="0.57" | 570 m || 
|-id=809 bgcolor=#fefefe
| 617809 ||  || — || January 28, 2014 || Mount Lemmon || Mount Lemmon Survey ||  || align=right data-sort-value="0.67" | 670 m || 
|-id=810 bgcolor=#fefefe
| 617810 ||  || — || January 26, 2017 || Mount Lemmon || Mount Lemmon Survey ||  || align=right data-sort-value="0.79" | 790 m || 
|-id=811 bgcolor=#d6d6d6
| 617811 ||  || — || December 30, 2005 || Kitt Peak || Spacewatch ||  || align=right | 1.7 km || 
|-id=812 bgcolor=#d6d6d6
| 617812 ||  || — || January 10, 2011 || Mount Lemmon || Mount Lemmon Survey ||  || align=right | 1.7 km || 
|-id=813 bgcolor=#fefefe
| 617813 ||  || — || December 17, 2001 || Kitt Peak || Spacewatch ||  || align=right data-sort-value="0.66" | 660 m || 
|-id=814 bgcolor=#E9E9E9
| 617814 ||  || — || December 27, 2005 || Kitt Peak || Spacewatch ||  || align=right | 2.0 km || 
|-id=815 bgcolor=#fefefe
| 617815 ||  || — || December 21, 2005 || Kitt Peak || Spacewatch ||  || align=right data-sort-value="0.57" | 570 m || 
|-id=816 bgcolor=#fefefe
| 617816 ||  || — || December 25, 2005 || Kitt Peak || Spacewatch ||  || align=right data-sort-value="0.60" | 600 m || 
|-id=817 bgcolor=#fefefe
| 617817 ||  || — || January 4, 2006 || Mount Lemmon || Mount Lemmon Survey ||  || align=right data-sort-value="0.47" | 470 m || 
|-id=818 bgcolor=#fefefe
| 617818 ||  || — || October 15, 2001 || Apache Point || SDSS Collaboration ||  || align=right data-sort-value="0.57" | 570 m || 
|-id=819 bgcolor=#E9E9E9
| 617819 ||  || — || January 5, 2006 || Kitt Peak || Spacewatch ||  || align=right | 2.4 km || 
|-id=820 bgcolor=#E9E9E9
| 617820 ||  || — || December 28, 2005 || Kitt Peak || Spacewatch ||  || align=right | 2.2 km || 
|-id=821 bgcolor=#E9E9E9
| 617821 ||  || — || December 27, 2005 || Mount Lemmon || Mount Lemmon Survey ||  || align=right | 2.4 km || 
|-id=822 bgcolor=#d6d6d6
| 617822 ||  || — || January 5, 2006 || Kitt Peak || Spacewatch ||  || align=right | 1.5 km || 
|-id=823 bgcolor=#fefefe
| 617823 ||  || — || January 9, 2006 || Kitt Peak || Spacewatch ||  || align=right data-sort-value="0.50" | 500 m || 
|-id=824 bgcolor=#E9E9E9
| 617824 ||  || — || March 6, 2011 || Mount Lemmon || Mount Lemmon Survey ||  || align=right | 1.7 km || 
|-id=825 bgcolor=#d6d6d6
| 617825 ||  || — || January 30, 2016 || Mount Lemmon || Mount Lemmon Survey ||  || align=right | 1.7 km || 
|-id=826 bgcolor=#C2FFFF
| 617826 ||  || — || January 12, 2018 || Haleakala || Pan-STARRS || L5 || align=right | 6.5 km || 
|-id=827 bgcolor=#d6d6d6
| 617827 ||  || — || October 16, 2009 || Mount Lemmon || Mount Lemmon Survey ||  || align=right | 1.7 km || 
|-id=828 bgcolor=#fefefe
| 617828 ||  || — || January 22, 2006 || Mount Lemmon || Mount Lemmon Survey ||  || align=right data-sort-value="0.59" | 590 m || 
|-id=829 bgcolor=#fefefe
| 617829 ||  || — || October 25, 2005 || Kitt Peak || Spacewatch ||  || align=right data-sort-value="0.79" | 790 m || 
|-id=830 bgcolor=#E9E9E9
| 617830 ||  || — || January 22, 2006 || Mount Lemmon || Mount Lemmon Survey ||  || align=right | 2.1 km || 
|-id=831 bgcolor=#d6d6d6
| 617831 ||  || — || January 23, 2006 || Kitt Peak || Spacewatch ||  || align=right | 2.0 km || 
|-id=832 bgcolor=#fefefe
| 617832 ||  || — || January 25, 2006 || Kitt Peak || Spacewatch ||  || align=right data-sort-value="0.67" | 670 m || 
|-id=833 bgcolor=#fefefe
| 617833 ||  || — || January 25, 2006 || Kitt Peak || Spacewatch ||  || align=right data-sort-value="0.79" | 790 m || 
|-id=834 bgcolor=#fefefe
| 617834 ||  || — || January 23, 2006 || Kitt Peak || Spacewatch ||  || align=right data-sort-value="0.74" | 740 m || 
|-id=835 bgcolor=#fefefe
| 617835 ||  || — || January 23, 2006 || Kitt Peak || Spacewatch ||  || align=right data-sort-value="0.67" | 670 m || 
|-id=836 bgcolor=#d6d6d6
| 617836 ||  || — || January 25, 2006 || Kitt Peak || Spacewatch ||  || align=right | 1.4 km || 
|-id=837 bgcolor=#fefefe
| 617837 ||  || — || January 25, 2006 || Kitt Peak || Spacewatch || H || align=right data-sort-value="0.42" | 420 m || 
|-id=838 bgcolor=#d6d6d6
| 617838 ||  || — || January 26, 2006 || Kitt Peak || Spacewatch ||  || align=right | 1.9 km || 
|-id=839 bgcolor=#C2FFFF
| 617839 ||  || — || January 26, 2006 || Kitt Peak || Spacewatch || L5 || align=right | 8.1 km || 
|-id=840 bgcolor=#fefefe
| 617840 ||  || — || January 26, 2006 || Kitt Peak || Spacewatch ||  || align=right data-sort-value="0.95" | 950 m || 
|-id=841 bgcolor=#d6d6d6
| 617841 ||  || — || January 27, 2006 || Kitt Peak || Spacewatch ||  || align=right | 1.9 km || 
|-id=842 bgcolor=#fefefe
| 617842 ||  || — || January 23, 2006 || Kitt Peak || Spacewatch ||  || align=right data-sort-value="0.84" | 840 m || 
|-id=843 bgcolor=#C2FFFF
| 617843 ||  || — || January 30, 2006 || Kitt Peak || Spacewatch || L5 || align=right | 7.5 km || 
|-id=844 bgcolor=#d6d6d6
| 617844 ||  || — || January 30, 2006 || Kitt Peak || Spacewatch ||  || align=right | 2.0 km || 
|-id=845 bgcolor=#fefefe
| 617845 ||  || — || January 30, 2006 || Kitt Peak || Spacewatch ||  || align=right data-sort-value="0.99" | 990 m || 
|-id=846 bgcolor=#E9E9E9
| 617846 ||  || — || January 23, 2006 || Kitt Peak || Spacewatch ||  || align=right | 1.6 km || 
|-id=847 bgcolor=#C2FFFF
| 617847 ||  || — || January 31, 2006 || Kitt Peak || Spacewatch || L5 || align=right | 6.8 km || 
|-id=848 bgcolor=#d6d6d6
| 617848 ||  || — || January 31, 2006 || Kitt Peak || Spacewatch ||  || align=right | 2.0 km || 
|-id=849 bgcolor=#fefefe
| 617849 ||  || — || January 13, 2002 || Kitt Peak || Spacewatch ||  || align=right | 1.1 km || 
|-id=850 bgcolor=#d6d6d6
| 617850 ||  || — || January 6, 2006 || Kitt Peak || Spacewatch ||  || align=right | 2.2 km || 
|-id=851 bgcolor=#C2FFFF
| 617851 ||  || — || January 26, 2006 || Kitt Peak || Spacewatch || L5 || align=right | 10 km || 
|-id=852 bgcolor=#d6d6d6
| 617852 ||  || — || January 25, 2006 || Kitt Peak || Spacewatch ||  || align=right | 1.7 km || 
|-id=853 bgcolor=#C2FFFF
| 617853 ||  || — || January 23, 2006 || Kitt Peak || Spacewatch || L5 || align=right | 7.1 km || 
|-id=854 bgcolor=#C2FFFF
| 617854 ||  || — || January 23, 2006 || Kitt Peak || Spacewatch || L5 || align=right | 8.2 km || 
|-id=855 bgcolor=#C2FFFF
| 617855 ||  || — || January 30, 2006 || Kitt Peak || Spacewatch || L5 || align=right | 7.5 km || 
|-id=856 bgcolor=#E9E9E9
| 617856 ||  || — || September 28, 2009 || Mount Lemmon || Mount Lemmon Survey ||  || align=right | 1.7 km || 
|-id=857 bgcolor=#C2FFFF
| 617857 ||  || — || January 26, 2006 || Mount Lemmon || Mount Lemmon Survey || L5 || align=right | 7.7 km || 
|-id=858 bgcolor=#d6d6d6
| 617858 ||  || — || October 21, 2014 || Kitt Peak || Spacewatch ||  || align=right | 1.8 km || 
|-id=859 bgcolor=#FA8072
| 617859 ||  || — || January 23, 2006 || Mount Lemmon || Mount Lemmon Survey || H || align=right data-sort-value="0.37" | 370 m || 
|-id=860 bgcolor=#C2FFFF
| 617860 ||  || — || December 13, 2004 || Kitt Peak || Spacewatch || L5 || align=right | 10 km || 
|-id=861 bgcolor=#C2FFFF
| 617861 ||  || — || February 2, 2006 || Kitt Peak || Spacewatch || L5 || align=right | 9.0 km || 
|-id=862 bgcolor=#d6d6d6
| 617862 ||  || — || February 2, 2006 || Mount Lemmon || Mount Lemmon Survey ||  || align=right | 1.7 km || 
|-id=863 bgcolor=#fefefe
| 617863 ||  || — || January 23, 2006 || Kitt Peak || Spacewatch ||  || align=right data-sort-value="0.72" | 720 m || 
|-id=864 bgcolor=#fefefe
| 617864 ||  || — || May 25, 2003 || Kitt Peak || Spacewatch ||  || align=right data-sort-value="0.79" | 790 m || 
|-id=865 bgcolor=#fefefe
| 617865 ||  || — || September 21, 2011 || Mount Lemmon || Mount Lemmon Survey ||  || align=right data-sort-value="0.68" | 680 m || 
|-id=866 bgcolor=#C2FFFF
| 617866 ||  || — || February 4, 2006 || Kitt Peak || Spacewatch || L5 || align=right | 7.2 km || 
|-id=867 bgcolor=#fefefe
| 617867 ||  || — || April 30, 2014 || Haleakala || Pan-STARRS ||  || align=right data-sort-value="0.88" | 880 m || 
|-id=868 bgcolor=#d6d6d6
| 617868 ||  || — || February 4, 2006 || Kitt Peak || Spacewatch ||  || align=right | 2.0 km || 
|-id=869 bgcolor=#fefefe
| 617869 ||  || — || February 2, 2006 || Kitt Peak || Spacewatch ||  || align=right data-sort-value="0.71" | 710 m || 
|-id=870 bgcolor=#d6d6d6
| 617870 ||  || — || February 20, 2006 || Kitt Peak || Spacewatch ||  || align=right | 1.9 km || 
|-id=871 bgcolor=#fefefe
| 617871 ||  || — || January 31, 2006 || Kitt Peak || Spacewatch ||  || align=right data-sort-value="0.64" | 640 m || 
|-id=872 bgcolor=#d6d6d6
| 617872 ||  || — || December 4, 2005 || Kitt Peak || Spacewatch ||  || align=right | 2.4 km || 
|-id=873 bgcolor=#C2FFFF
| 617873 ||  || — || January 30, 2006 || Kitt Peak || Spacewatch || L5 || align=right | 6.7 km || 
|-id=874 bgcolor=#C2FFFF
| 617874 ||  || — || February 4, 2006 || Kitt Peak || Spacewatch || L5 || align=right | 6.1 km || 
|-id=875 bgcolor=#d6d6d6
| 617875 ||  || — || February 24, 2006 || Kitt Peak || Spacewatch ||  || align=right | 2.1 km || 
|-id=876 bgcolor=#d6d6d6
| 617876 ||  || — || February 24, 2006 || Kitt Peak || Spacewatch ||  || align=right | 1.8 km || 
|-id=877 bgcolor=#C2FFFF
| 617877 ||  || — || January 26, 2006 || Kitt Peak || Spacewatch || L5 || align=right | 8.5 km || 
|-id=878 bgcolor=#C2FFFF
| 617878 ||  || — || February 25, 2006 || Kitt Peak || Spacewatch || L5 || align=right | 8.7 km || 
|-id=879 bgcolor=#fefefe
| 617879 ||  || — || February 25, 2006 || Kitt Peak || Spacewatch ||  || align=right data-sort-value="0.75" | 750 m || 
|-id=880 bgcolor=#C2FFFF
| 617880 ||  || — || February 27, 2006 || Mount Lemmon || Mount Lemmon Survey || L5 || align=right | 7.0 km || 
|-id=881 bgcolor=#d6d6d6
| 617881 ||  || — || February 27, 2006 || Kitt Peak || Spacewatch ||  || align=right | 1.9 km || 
|-id=882 bgcolor=#C2FFFF
| 617882 ||  || — || February 27, 2006 || Kitt Peak || Spacewatch || L5 || align=right | 11 km || 
|-id=883 bgcolor=#d6d6d6
| 617883 ||  || — || February 27, 2006 || Kitt Peak || Spacewatch ||  || align=right | 2.2 km || 
|-id=884 bgcolor=#E9E9E9
| 617884 ||  || — || February 25, 2006 || Mount Lemmon || Mount Lemmon Survey ||  || align=right | 2.1 km || 
|-id=885 bgcolor=#C2FFFF
| 617885 ||  || — || April 15, 2007 || Mount Lemmon || Mount Lemmon Survey || L5 || align=right | 8.2 km || 
|-id=886 bgcolor=#fefefe
| 617886 ||  || — || March 12, 2010 || Kitt Peak || Spacewatch ||  || align=right data-sort-value="0.78" | 780 m || 
|-id=887 bgcolor=#C2FFFF
| 617887 ||  || — || February 27, 2006 || Mount Lemmon || Mount Lemmon Survey || L5 || align=right | 7.0 km || 
|-id=888 bgcolor=#d6d6d6
| 617888 ||  || — || November 17, 2009 || Mount Lemmon || Mount Lemmon Survey ||  || align=right | 2.2 km || 
|-id=889 bgcolor=#d6d6d6
| 617889 ||  || — || March 2, 2006 || Kitt Peak || Spacewatch ||  || align=right | 2.0 km || 
|-id=890 bgcolor=#d6d6d6
| 617890 ||  || — || February 27, 2006 || Kitt Peak || Spacewatch ||  || align=right | 2.2 km || 
|-id=891 bgcolor=#C2FFFF
| 617891 ||  || — || March 3, 2006 || Kitt Peak || Spacewatch || L5 || align=right | 8.7 km || 
|-id=892 bgcolor=#d6d6d6
| 617892 ||  || — || September 28, 2003 || Apache Point || SDSS Collaboration ||  || align=right | 1.8 km || 
|-id=893 bgcolor=#C2FFFF
| 617893 ||  || — || February 10, 2005 || La Silla || A. Boattini || L5 || align=right | 7.5 km || 
|-id=894 bgcolor=#C2FFFF
| 617894 ||  || — || October 15, 2012 || Haleakala || Pan-STARRS || L5 || align=right | 7.7 km || 
|-id=895 bgcolor=#fefefe
| 617895 ||  || — || February 17, 2013 || Kitt Peak || Spacewatch ||  || align=right data-sort-value="0.44" | 440 m || 
|-id=896 bgcolor=#E9E9E9
| 617896 ||  || — || March 6, 2006 || Mount Lemmon || Mount Lemmon Survey ||  || align=right | 1.6 km || 
|-id=897 bgcolor=#fefefe
| 617897 ||  || — || March 23, 2006 || Mount Lemmon || Mount Lemmon Survey || H || align=right data-sort-value="0.59" | 590 m || 
|-id=898 bgcolor=#d6d6d6
| 617898 ||  || — || March 23, 2006 || Kitt Peak || Spacewatch ||  || align=right | 1.9 km || 
|-id=899 bgcolor=#d6d6d6
| 617899 ||  || — || April 2, 2006 || Kitt Peak || Spacewatch ||  || align=right | 1.9 km || 
|-id=900 bgcolor=#d6d6d6
| 617900 ||  || — || April 20, 2006 || Kitt Peak || Spacewatch ||  || align=right | 2.6 km || 
|}

617901–618000 

|-bgcolor=#fefefe
| 617901 ||  || — || April 27, 2006 || Kitt Peak || Spacewatch ||  || align=right data-sort-value="0.72" | 720 m || 
|-id=902 bgcolor=#d6d6d6
| 617902 ||  || — || April 30, 2006 || Kitt Peak || Spacewatch ||  || align=right | 2.0 km || 
|-id=903 bgcolor=#d6d6d6
| 617903 ||  || — || January 30, 2006 || Kitt Peak || Spacewatch ||  || align=right | 1.8 km || 
|-id=904 bgcolor=#d6d6d6
| 617904 ||  || — || April 26, 2006 || Cerro Tololo || Cerro Tololo Obs. ||  || align=right | 2.0 km || 
|-id=905 bgcolor=#d6d6d6
| 617905 ||  || — || May 26, 2006 || Mount Lemmon || Mount Lemmon Survey ||  || align=right | 2.0 km || 
|-id=906 bgcolor=#d6d6d6
| 617906 ||  || — || May 1, 2006 || Kitt Peak || D. E. Trilling ||  || align=right | 2.0 km || 
|-id=907 bgcolor=#d6d6d6
| 617907 ||  || — || May 1, 2006 || Kitt Peak || D. E. Trilling ||  || align=right | 1.9 km || 
|-id=908 bgcolor=#d6d6d6
| 617908 ||  || — || May 1, 2006 || Kitt Peak || D. E. Trilling ||  || align=right | 2.0 km || 
|-id=909 bgcolor=#d6d6d6
| 617909 ||  || — || October 1, 2013 || Kitt Peak || Spacewatch ||  || align=right | 2.6 km || 
|-id=910 bgcolor=#d6d6d6
| 617910 ||  || — || April 30, 2006 || Kitt Peak || Spacewatch ||  || align=right | 2.2 km || 
|-id=911 bgcolor=#d6d6d6
| 617911 ||  || — || May 24, 2006 || Kitt Peak || Spacewatch ||  || align=right | 2.7 km || 
|-id=912 bgcolor=#fefefe
| 617912 ||  || — || July 4, 2003 || Kitt Peak || Spacewatch ||  || align=right | 1.1 km || 
|-id=913 bgcolor=#fefefe
| 617913 ||  || — || May 24, 2006 || Mount Lemmon || Mount Lemmon Survey ||  || align=right data-sort-value="0.51" | 510 m || 
|-id=914 bgcolor=#d6d6d6
| 617914 ||  || — || May 26, 2006 || Kitt Peak || Spacewatch ||  || align=right | 2.3 km || 
|-id=915 bgcolor=#d6d6d6
| 617915 ||  || — || December 22, 2003 || Kitt Peak || Spacewatch ||  || align=right | 2.8 km || 
|-id=916 bgcolor=#fefefe
| 617916 ||  || — || May 21, 2006 || Kitt Peak || Spacewatch || H || align=right data-sort-value="0.56" | 560 m || 
|-id=917 bgcolor=#d6d6d6
| 617917 ||  || — || May 25, 2006 || Mauna Kea || Mauna Kea Obs. ||  || align=right | 1.8 km || 
|-id=918 bgcolor=#d6d6d6
| 617918 ||  || — || March 10, 2005 || Mount Lemmon || Mount Lemmon Survey ||  || align=right | 2.1 km || 
|-id=919 bgcolor=#fefefe
| 617919 ||  || — || May 26, 2006 || Mount Lemmon || Mount Lemmon Survey || H || align=right data-sort-value="0.42" | 420 m || 
|-id=920 bgcolor=#E9E9E9
| 617920 ||  || — || June 22, 2015 || Haleakala || Pan-STARRS ||  || align=right data-sort-value="0.92" | 920 m || 
|-id=921 bgcolor=#fefefe
| 617921 ||  || — || April 21, 2009 || Mount Lemmon || Mount Lemmon Survey ||  || align=right data-sort-value="0.52" | 520 m || 
|-id=922 bgcolor=#d6d6d6
| 617922 ||  || — || April 6, 2011 || Mount Lemmon || Mount Lemmon Survey ||  || align=right | 2.6 km || 
|-id=923 bgcolor=#d6d6d6
| 617923 ||  || — || November 1, 2008 || Mount Lemmon || Mount Lemmon Survey ||  || align=right | 2.3 km || 
|-id=924 bgcolor=#d6d6d6
| 617924 ||  || — || March 30, 2011 || Haleakala || Pan-STARRS || Tj (2.99) || align=right | 3.3 km || 
|-id=925 bgcolor=#E9E9E9
| 617925 ||  || — || May 22, 2014 || Mount Lemmon || Mount Lemmon Survey ||  || align=right data-sort-value="0.73" | 730 m || 
|-id=926 bgcolor=#fefefe
| 617926 ||  || — || June 19, 2006 || Mount Lemmon || Mount Lemmon Survey ||  || align=right data-sort-value="0.51" | 510 m || 
|-id=927 bgcolor=#d6d6d6
| 617927 ||  || — || April 21, 2006 || Kitt Peak || Spacewatch ||  || align=right | 3.0 km || 
|-id=928 bgcolor=#E9E9E9
| 617928 ||  || — || March 6, 2013 || Haleakala || Pan-STARRS ||  || align=right | 1.2 km || 
|-id=929 bgcolor=#fefefe
| 617929 ||  || — || May 26, 2014 || Haleakala || Pan-STARRS || H || align=right data-sort-value="0.55" | 550 m || 
|-id=930 bgcolor=#fefefe
| 617930 ||  || — || April 22, 2009 || Mount Lemmon || Mount Lemmon Survey ||  || align=right data-sort-value="0.56" | 560 m || 
|-id=931 bgcolor=#E9E9E9
| 617931 ||  || — || June 18, 2006 || Palomar || NEAT ||  || align=right | 1.4 km || 
|-id=932 bgcolor=#fefefe
| 617932 ||  || — || January 15, 2008 || Kitt Peak || Spacewatch ||  || align=right data-sort-value="0.56" | 560 m || 
|-id=933 bgcolor=#E9E9E9
| 617933 ||  || — || July 19, 2006 || Mauna Kea || Mauna Kea Obs. ||  || align=right data-sort-value="0.74" | 740 m || 
|-id=934 bgcolor=#d6d6d6
| 617934 ||  || — || July 5, 2017 || Haleakala || Pan-STARRS ||  || align=right | 2.2 km || 
|-id=935 bgcolor=#E9E9E9
| 617935 ||  || — || June 5, 2018 || Haleakala || Pan-STARRS ||  || align=right data-sort-value="0.86" | 860 m || 
|-id=936 bgcolor=#fefefe
| 617936 ||  || — || October 20, 2016 || Mount Lemmon || Mount Lemmon Survey ||  || align=right data-sort-value="0.61" | 610 m || 
|-id=937 bgcolor=#E9E9E9
| 617937 ||  || — || August 13, 2006 || Palomar || NEAT ||  || align=right | 1.4 km || 
|-id=938 bgcolor=#E9E9E9
| 617938 ||  || — || July 29, 2014 || Haleakala || Pan-STARRS ||  || align=right data-sort-value="0.82" | 820 m || 
|-id=939 bgcolor=#d6d6d6
| 617939 ||  || — || August 17, 2006 || Palomar || NEAT ||  || align=right | 3.5 km || 
|-id=940 bgcolor=#E9E9E9
| 617940 ||  || — || July 29, 2006 || Siding Spring || SSS ||  || align=right | 1.7 km || 
|-id=941 bgcolor=#fefefe
| 617941 ||  || — || August 24, 2006 || Socorro || LINEAR ||  || align=right data-sort-value="0.57" | 570 m || 
|-id=942 bgcolor=#fefefe
| 617942 ||  || — || August 21, 2006 || Kitt Peak || Spacewatch ||  || align=right data-sort-value="0.60" | 600 m || 
|-id=943 bgcolor=#fefefe
| 617943 ||  || — || August 21, 2006 || Kitt Peak || Spacewatch ||  || align=right data-sort-value="0.59" | 590 m || 
|-id=944 bgcolor=#fefefe
| 617944 ||  || — || August 24, 2006 || Palomar || NEAT ||  || align=right data-sort-value="0.65" | 650 m || 
|-id=945 bgcolor=#fefefe
| 617945 ||  || — || August 19, 2006 || Kitt Peak || Spacewatch ||  || align=right data-sort-value="0.72" | 720 m || 
|-id=946 bgcolor=#fefefe
| 617946 ||  || — || August 18, 2006 || Kitt Peak || Spacewatch ||  || align=right data-sort-value="0.60" | 600 m || 
|-id=947 bgcolor=#fefefe
| 617947 ||  || — || July 25, 2006 || Mount Lemmon || Mount Lemmon Survey ||  || align=right data-sort-value="0.59" | 590 m || 
|-id=948 bgcolor=#d6d6d6
| 617948 ||  || — || August 28, 2006 || Kitt Peak || Spacewatch ||  || align=right | 2.2 km || 
|-id=949 bgcolor=#fefefe
| 617949 ||  || — || August 28, 2006 || Anderson Mesa || LONEOS ||  || align=right data-sort-value="0.55" | 550 m || 
|-id=950 bgcolor=#d6d6d6
| 617950 ||  || — || August 18, 2006 || Kitt Peak || Spacewatch ||  || align=right | 2.7 km || 
|-id=951 bgcolor=#d6d6d6
| 617951 ||  || — || August 19, 2006 || Kitt Peak || Spacewatch ||  || align=right | 1.9 km || 
|-id=952 bgcolor=#d6d6d6
| 617952 ||  || — || August 19, 2006 || Kitt Peak || Spacewatch ||  || align=right | 2.4 km || 
|-id=953 bgcolor=#E9E9E9
| 617953 ||  || — || August 19, 2006 || Kitt Peak || Spacewatch ||  || align=right data-sort-value="0.83" | 830 m || 
|-id=954 bgcolor=#fefefe
| 617954 ||  || — || November 24, 2003 || Kitt Peak || Spacewatch ||  || align=right data-sort-value="0.59" | 590 m || 
|-id=955 bgcolor=#E9E9E9
| 617955 ||  || — || August 22, 2006 || Cerro Tololo || L. H. Wasserman ||  || align=right data-sort-value="0.75" | 750 m || 
|-id=956 bgcolor=#E9E9E9
| 617956 ||  || — || August 28, 2006 || Kitt Peak || Spacewatch ||  || align=right | 1.0 km || 
|-id=957 bgcolor=#E9E9E9
| 617957 ||  || — || August 19, 2006 || Kitt Peak || Spacewatch ||  || align=right data-sort-value="0.80" | 800 m || 
|-id=958 bgcolor=#fefefe
| 617958 ||  || — || August 27, 2006 || Kitt Peak || Spacewatch ||  || align=right data-sort-value="0.65" | 650 m || 
|-id=959 bgcolor=#E9E9E9
| 617959 ||  || — || August 22, 2006 || Palomar || NEAT ||  || align=right | 1.3 km || 
|-id=960 bgcolor=#E9E9E9
| 617960 ||  || — || August 19, 2006 || Kitt Peak || Spacewatch ||  || align=right | 1.3 km || 
|-id=961 bgcolor=#fefefe
| 617961 ||  || — || August 29, 2006 || Kitt Peak || Spacewatch ||  || align=right data-sort-value="0.58" | 580 m || 
|-id=962 bgcolor=#fefefe
| 617962 ||  || — || August 28, 2006 || Kitt Peak || Spacewatch ||  || align=right data-sort-value="0.55" | 550 m || 
|-id=963 bgcolor=#E9E9E9
| 617963 ||  || — || December 27, 2011 || Kitt Peak || Spacewatch ||  || align=right data-sort-value="0.83" | 830 m || 
|-id=964 bgcolor=#E9E9E9
| 617964 ||  || — || March 18, 2013 || Mount Lemmon || Mount Lemmon Survey ||  || align=right | 1.3 km || 
|-id=965 bgcolor=#fefefe
| 617965 ||  || — || March 29, 2012 || Mount Lemmon || Mount Lemmon Survey ||  || align=right data-sort-value="0.45" | 450 m || 
|-id=966 bgcolor=#E9E9E9
| 617966 ||  || — || August 29, 2006 || Catalina || CSS ||  || align=right | 1.3 km || 
|-id=967 bgcolor=#fefefe
| 617967 ||  || — || September 14, 2006 || Kitt Peak || Spacewatch ||  || align=right data-sort-value="0.68" | 680 m || 
|-id=968 bgcolor=#fefefe
| 617968 ||  || — || September 14, 2006 || Palomar || NEAT ||  || align=right data-sort-value="0.70" | 700 m || 
|-id=969 bgcolor=#d6d6d6
| 617969 ||  || — || September 14, 2006 || Kitt Peak || Spacewatch ||  || align=right | 2.4 km || 
|-id=970 bgcolor=#E9E9E9
| 617970 ||  || — || August 29, 2006 || Kitt Peak || Spacewatch ||  || align=right | 1.7 km || 
|-id=971 bgcolor=#fefefe
| 617971 ||  || — || September 14, 2006 || Catalina || CSS ||  || align=right data-sort-value="0.90" | 900 m || 
|-id=972 bgcolor=#d6d6d6
| 617972 ||  || — || August 29, 2006 || Kitt Peak || Spacewatch || 3:2 || align=right | 4.2 km || 
|-id=973 bgcolor=#d6d6d6
| 617973 ||  || — || September 14, 2006 || Kitt Peak || Spacewatch ||  || align=right | 2.7 km || 
|-id=974 bgcolor=#E9E9E9
| 617974 ||  || — || September 14, 2006 || Palomar || NEAT ||  || align=right | 1.4 km || 
|-id=975 bgcolor=#E9E9E9
| 617975 ||  || — || September 14, 2006 || Kitt Peak || Spacewatch ||  || align=right data-sort-value="0.76" | 760 m || 
|-id=976 bgcolor=#fefefe
| 617976 ||  || — || September 15, 2006 || Kitt Peak || Spacewatch ||  || align=right data-sort-value="0.52" | 520 m || 
|-id=977 bgcolor=#fefefe
| 617977 ||  || — || September 15, 2006 || Kitt Peak || Spacewatch ||  || align=right data-sort-value="0.53" | 530 m || 
|-id=978 bgcolor=#fefefe
| 617978 ||  || — || September 13, 2006 || Palomar || NEAT || H || align=right data-sort-value="0.72" | 720 m || 
|-id=979 bgcolor=#d6d6d6
| 617979 ||  || — || September 15, 2006 || Kitt Peak || Spacewatch ||  || align=right | 2.4 km || 
|-id=980 bgcolor=#E9E9E9
| 617980 ||  || — || December 5, 2007 || Kitt Peak || Spacewatch ||  || align=right | 1.0 km || 
|-id=981 bgcolor=#E9E9E9
| 617981 ||  || — || September 14, 2006 || Mauna Kea || J. Masiero, R. Jedicke ||  || align=right data-sort-value="0.96" | 960 m || 
|-id=982 bgcolor=#d6d6d6
| 617982 ||  || — || September 16, 2006 || Kitt Peak || Spacewatch ||  || align=right | 2.3 km || 
|-id=983 bgcolor=#E9E9E9
| 617983 ||  || — || September 16, 2006 || Catalina || CSS ||  || align=right | 1.3 km || 
|-id=984 bgcolor=#E9E9E9
| 617984 ||  || — || September 19, 2006 || Anderson Mesa || LONEOS ||  || align=right data-sort-value="0.74" | 740 m || 
|-id=985 bgcolor=#E9E9E9
| 617985 ||  || — || September 19, 2006 || Kitt Peak || Spacewatch ||  || align=right | 1.1 km || 
|-id=986 bgcolor=#fefefe
| 617986 ||  || — || September 21, 2006 || Anderson Mesa || LONEOS ||  || align=right data-sort-value="0.76" | 760 m || 
|-id=987 bgcolor=#fefefe
| 617987 ||  || — || September 19, 2006 || Kitt Peak || Spacewatch ||  || align=right data-sort-value="0.51" | 510 m || 
|-id=988 bgcolor=#E9E9E9
| 617988 ||  || — || September 21, 2006 || Bergisch Gladbach || W. Bickel ||  || align=right | 1.2 km || 
|-id=989 bgcolor=#E9E9E9
| 617989 ||  || — || September 17, 2006 || Kitt Peak || Spacewatch ||  || align=right | 1.0 km || 
|-id=990 bgcolor=#E9E9E9
| 617990 ||  || — || February 16, 2004 || Kitt Peak || Spacewatch ||  || align=right | 1.5 km || 
|-id=991 bgcolor=#E9E9E9
| 617991 ||  || — || September 19, 2006 || Kitt Peak || Spacewatch ||  || align=right | 1.2 km || 
|-id=992 bgcolor=#d6d6d6
| 617992 ||  || — || September 26, 2006 || Catalina || CSS ||  || align=right | 3.3 km || 
|-id=993 bgcolor=#fefefe
| 617993 ||  || — || September 26, 2006 || Kitt Peak || Spacewatch ||  || align=right data-sort-value="0.60" | 600 m || 
|-id=994 bgcolor=#E9E9E9
| 617994 ||  || — || September 18, 2006 || Kitt Peak || Spacewatch ||  || align=right data-sort-value="0.98" | 980 m || 
|-id=995 bgcolor=#E9E9E9
| 617995 ||  || — || September 27, 2006 || Mount Lemmon || Mount Lemmon Survey ||  || align=right data-sort-value="0.67" | 670 m || 
|-id=996 bgcolor=#E9E9E9
| 617996 ||  || — || September 17, 2006 || Kitt Peak || Spacewatch ||  || align=right data-sort-value="0.63" | 630 m || 
|-id=997 bgcolor=#fefefe
| 617997 ||  || — || September 26, 2006 || Kitt Peak || Spacewatch ||  || align=right data-sort-value="0.57" | 570 m || 
|-id=998 bgcolor=#FA8072
| 617998 ||  || — || October 23, 2003 || Kitt Peak || L. H. Wasserman, D. E. Trilling ||  || align=right data-sort-value="0.62" | 620 m || 
|-id=999 bgcolor=#E9E9E9
| 617999 ||  || — || September 17, 2006 || Kitt Peak || Spacewatch ||  || align=right | 1.0 km || 
|-id=000 bgcolor=#E9E9E9
| 618000 ||  || — || September 27, 2006 || Kitt Peak || Spacewatch ||  || align=right data-sort-value="0.42" | 420 m || 
|}

References

External links 
 Discovery Circumstances: Numbered Minor Planets (615001)–(620000) (IAU Minor Planet Center)

0617